= HD 166473 =

Star in the constellation Corona Australis

- Location of HD 166473 (circled)

Observation data Epoch J2000.0 Equinox ICRS
- Constellation: Corona Australis
- Right ascension: 18^{h} 12^{m} 25.83474^{s}
- Declination: −37° 45′ 09.2713″
- Apparent magnitude (V): 7.953

Characteristics
- Evolutionary stage: main sequence
- Spectral type: A5pSrCrEu
- B−V color index: 0.42
- J−H color index: -0.018
- J−K color index: -0.026
- Variable type: α^{2} CVn variable

Astrometry
Radial velocity (R_{v})	−22.5±3.0 km/s
Proper motion (μ)	RA: -2.767 mas/yr Dec.: −12.785 mas/yr
Parallax (π)	7.1672±0.0337 mas
Distance	455 ± 2 ly (139.5 ± 0.7 pc)
Absolute magnitude (M_{V})	1.60, 2.197

Details
Mass	2.29 M_{☉}
Radius	2.25 R_{☉}
Luminosity	18.03 L_{☉}, 9.811 L_{☉}
Surface gravity (log g)	4.00 cgs
Temperature	7760 K
Rotation	3836 ± 30 d
Age	1.00 Gyr

Other designations
- CD−37°12303, CPD−37°7956, HD 166473, PPM 749478, TIC 368866492, TYC 7900-2776-1, GSC 07900-02776, 2MASS J18122583-3745092, Gaia DR2 4037543655114296576, V694 CrA

Database references
SIMBAD	data

HD 166473 is a rapidly oscillating Ap star (roAp star) and an α^{2} CVn variable located about 455 light-years (140 parsecs) away in the southern constellation of Corona Australis. It has the variable star designation V694 Coronae Australis (sometimes abbreviated to V694 CrA). With an apparent magnitude of 7.953, it is too faint to be seen by the naked eye from Earth, but can be observed using binoculars.

== Properties ==
As is thought to be the case with most roAp stars, it has an overabundance of rare-earth elements as well as chromium and cobalt, solar-like levels of iron and nickel, and deficiencies in carbon and oxygen.

HD 166473 possesses one of the strongest magnetic fields of any Ap star at up to −4160±226 G, around ten thousand times stronger than Earth's magnetic field (0.25-0.65 G). The strength and orientation of the magnetic field is strongly correlated with the layer of the atmosphere specific elements land in. This can be seen in the difference in radial velocity variations caused by pulsations of the star, which are observed in the emission lines of different elements within the spectrum of the star. In particular, rare-earth elements show an amplitude as high as 110 m/s, while other elements including iron show no signs of variation at all.

It is also an extremely slow rotator, taking over a decade to rotate on its axis once. For comparison, the Sun's rotation period is only 25.38 days. Despite this, the magnetic properties of the star are essentially the same as that of Ap stars that rotate faster.

== Observational history ==
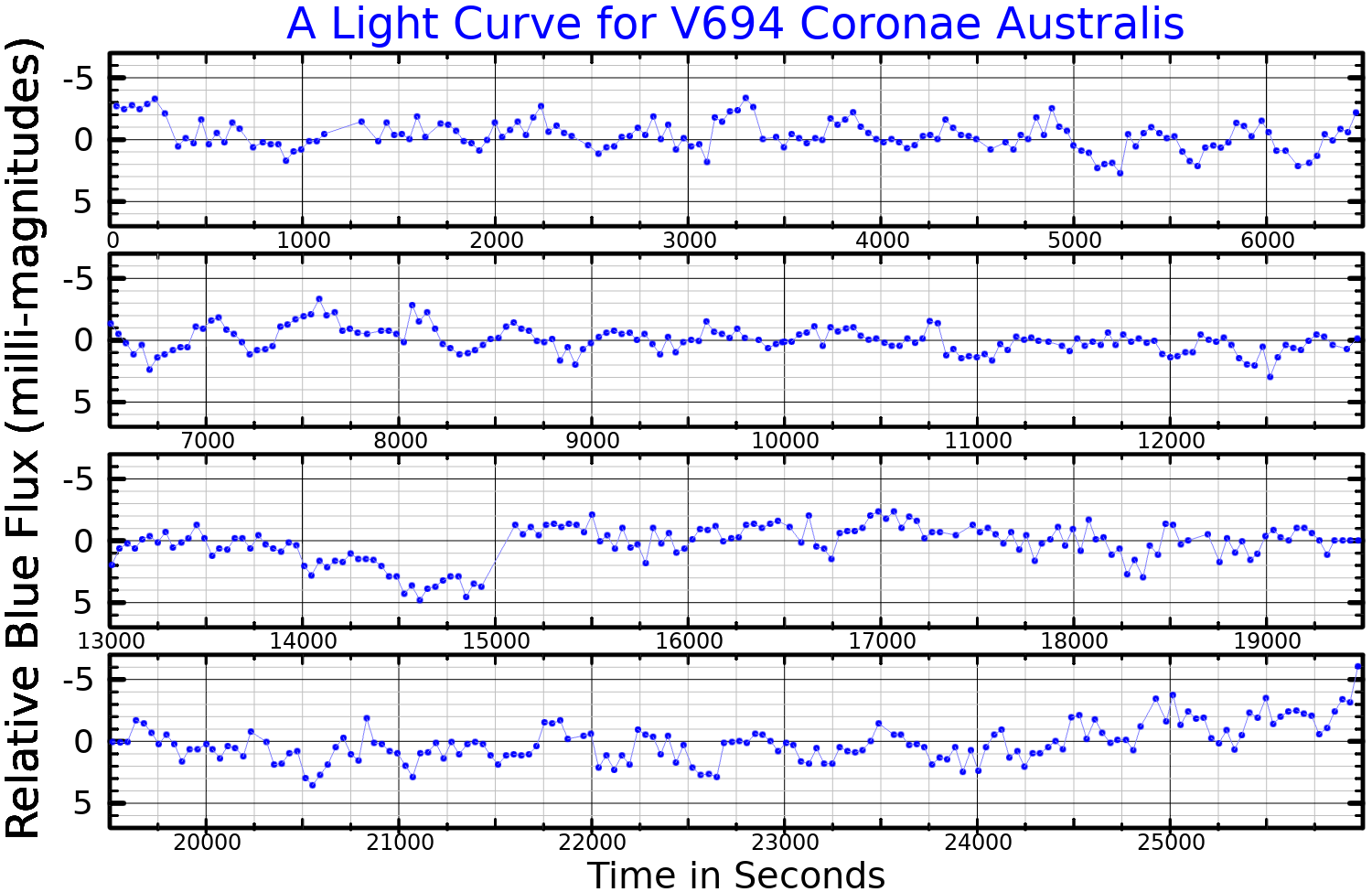
A blue band light curve for HD 166473, adapted from Kurtz & Martinez (1987)

Oscillations of the star were first discovered in 1987, with three distinct frequencies that each correspond to periods between 8.8 and 9.1 minutes and have low amplitudes between 0.25 and 0.49 millimagnitudes. Because the frequencies are not equally spaced apart, it cannot be explained using the oblique pulsator model, which is unusual since in general the model can accurately depict pulsations of roAp stars.

In 2003, the pulsations were further resolved into standing and travelling waves in the stellar atmosphere utilizing the VLT, making HD 166473 the first star other than the Sun for such observations to be conducted.

In 2020, the rotation period of the star was determined to be 3,836 days (10.50 years), making it only the fourth ever Ap star with a rotational period exceeding ten years whose magnetic field has been observed for an entire cycle or more.

== See also ==
- Other slow-rotating Ap stars:
  - GY Andromedae (HD 9996)
  - KQ Velorum (HD 94660)
  - Przybylski's star (HD 101065)
  - HD 187474
