= HN Andromedae =

Star in the constellation Andromeda

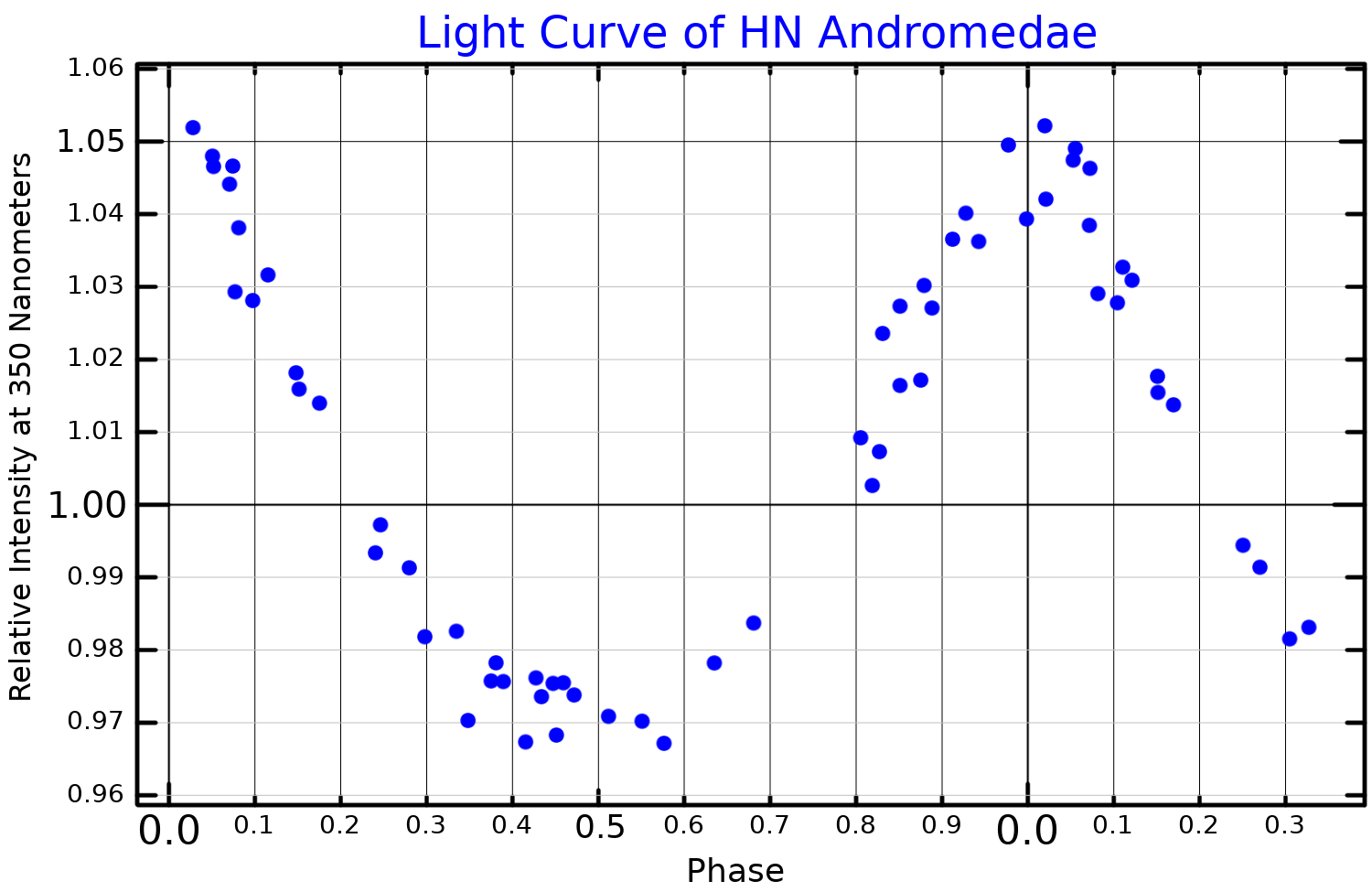
- The light curve of HN Andromedae at 350 nm adapted from Hempelmann & Schoeneich, 1987

Observation data Epoch J2000 Equinox ICRS
- Constellation: Andromeda
- Right ascension: 01^{h} 24^{m} 18.6762^{s}
- Declination: +43° 08′ 31.629″
- Apparent magnitude (V): 6.67 – 6.76 variable

Characteristics
- Spectral type: A2pSrCrEu
- Apparent magnitude (B): 6.704
- Apparent magnitude (V): 6.676
- Apparent magnitude (G): 6.6505
- Apparent magnitude (J): 6.457
- Apparent magnitude (H): 6.534
- Apparent magnitude (K): 6.495
- Variable type: α^{2} CVn

Astrometry
Radial velocity (R_{v})	3.0±3.3 km/s
Proper motion (μ)	RA: −4.355±0.190 mas/yr Dec.: −13.258±0.169 mas/yr
Parallax (π)	3.437±0.098 mas
Distance	950 ± 30 ly (291 ± 8 pc)

Orbit
Period (P)	106.357±0.009 days
Eccentricity (e)	0.122±0.010
Periastron epoch (T)	HJD 2444952.21±1.32
Argument of periastron (ω) (secondary)	279.76±4.75°
Semi-amplitude (K_{1}) (primary)	26.85±0.29 km/s

Details
Mass	2.76±0.18 M_{☉}
Radius	3.86±0.66 R_{☉}
Luminosity	93 L_{☉}
Surface gravity (log g)	3.3 cgs
Temperature	9,617 K
Rotational velocity (v sin i)	<2.35 km/s

Other designations
- 2MASS J01241868+4308315, BD+42 293, HD 8441, HIP 6560, TYC 2825-2536-1, SAO 37177

Database references
SIMBAD	data

HN Andromedae (often abbreviated to HN And) is a variable star in the constellation Andromeda. Its apparent visual magnitude varies between 6.67 and 6.76 in a cycle of 69.51 days. It is classified as an α^{2} Canum Venaticorum variable.

== System ==
The HN Andromedae system is triple, as seen in periodic radial velocity variations. The primary component is a star that is leaving the main sequence with an absolute magnitude M_{v}=−0.03±0.42, dominates the observed spectrum and its spectral classification is A2pSrCrEu, meaning that it has stronger than usual absorption lines of strontium, chromium and europium. It is also a chemically peculiar star and classified as an Ap star.

The other two components contribute just 0.23 magnitudes to the apparent magnitude of HN Andromedae. One has an orbital period of 106.3 days, and some orbital parameters can be computed. The other has an orbital period longer than 5000 days.

== Variability ==
The variability of HN Andromedae can be totally ascribed to the primary component, and is compatible with its stellar rotation; this gives the classification as an α^{2} Canum Venaticorum variable. Magnetic fields in this star are strong and variable, and this is thought to happen when the magnetic dipole axis in the star is not aligned to the rotation axis. Also, the distribution of metals, and consequently the surface brightness, is not uniform on the surface, and this causes the brightness observed variation.
