= HD 188101 =

Star in the constellation Cygnus

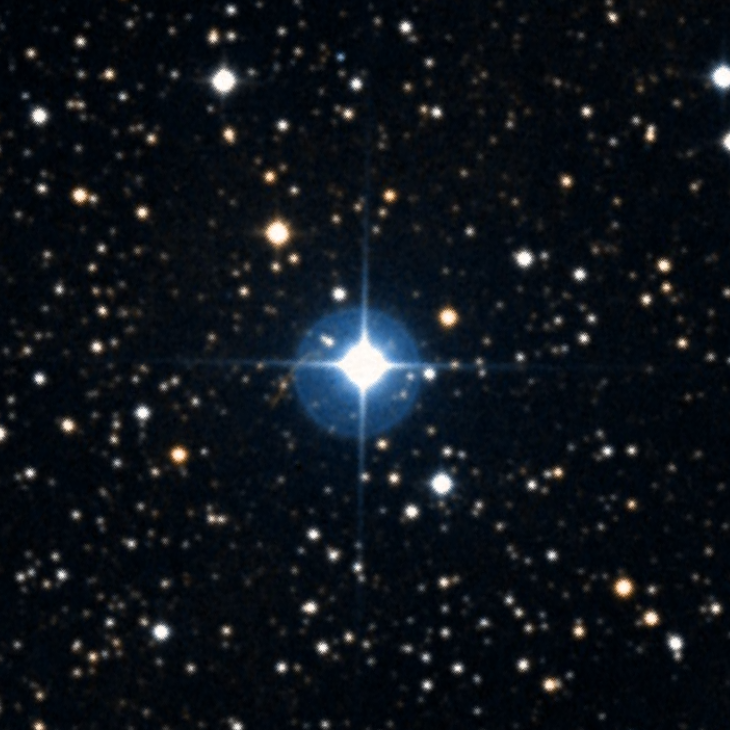
- The star HD 188101 imaged by the Digitized Sky Survey

Observation data Epoch J2000 Equinox ICRS
- Constellation: Cygnus
- Right ascension: 19^{h} 51^{m} 50.999^{s}
- Declination: +41° 20′ 55.68″
- Apparent magnitude (V): 7.74

Characteristics
- Evolutionary stage: Main sequence
- Spectral type: B9
- B−V color index: 0.052±0.30
- Variable type: α^{2} CVn

Astrometry
Radial velocity (R_{v})	0.863422 km/s
Proper motion (μ)	RA: 0.934 mas/yr Dec.: 0.576 mas/yr
Parallax (π)	2.3391±0.0950 mas
Distance	1,390 ± 60 ly (430 ± 20 pc)

Details
Mass	4.13±0.77 M_{☉}
Radius	3.1+2.1 −0.9 R_{☉}
Luminosity	360+280 −120 L_{☉}
Surface gravity (log g)	3.70±0.16 cgs
Temperature	14,200±990 K
Rotation	3.98726 d
Rotational velocity (v sin i)	33 km/s

Other designations
- BD+40 3912, HD 188101, HIP 97750, PPM 58952, KIC 6065699, 2MASS J19515098+4120556

Database references
SIMBAD	data

HD 188101 is a chemically peculiar star of spectral type B, located in the constellation Cygnus, at a distance of 430 parsecs (1,400 ly) from Earth. The star belongs to the group of chemically peculiar He-weak SiTiSr stars. The object is characterized by the presence of a weak magnetic field and an inhomogeneous distribution of chemical elements on its surface.

The star's mass is 4.13 M_{☉}, and its radius is 3.1 R_{☉}. The effective temperature is 14,200 K. The surface gravity, log g, is 3.70 cgs. This value indicates that the star has left or is leaving the initial main sequence. The star has a rotational velocity of 33 km/s and a rotation period of 3.98726 days.

== Atmospheric composition ==
A detailed analysis of the atmospheric chemical composition of HD 188101, conducted with consideration for non-local thermodynamic equilibrium (non-LTE) deviations, reveals significant departures from solar element abundances.

A moderate helium deficiency is observed in the star. The relative abundance log(He/H) is approximately −1.14±0.39, which is lower than the solar value. Furthermore, a significant silicon overabundance was detected. The silicon abundance is log(Si/H) ≈ −3.74, which is substantially higher than the solar level. Titanium and strontium lines are strongly enhanced. Their overabundance is the primary characteristic for classifying the star into the SiTiSr object group. The abundances of carbon and oxygen are generally close to standard solar values, while magnesium and iron peak elements are unevenly distributed and show local excesses.

== Surface ==
HD 188101 exhibits pronounced spectral variability caused by the rotation of the star. The elements are unevenly distributed across the photosphere, forming large-scale chemical spots.

Analysis of the equivalent widths of spectral lines revealed a stable anticorrelation between different groups of elements. Variations in helium (He I) and magnesium (Mg II) lines occur out of phase with lines of metals such as silicon (Si II, Si III), titanium (Ti II), and iron (Fe II). This indicates that helium-magnesium regions are spatially separated from regions rich in silicon and titanium. In addition, vertical stratification of elements is observed, as lines of different ions of the same chemical element indicate a concentration gradient through the depth of the stellar atmosphere.

== Magnetic field ==
Like most chemically peculiar Bp-type stars, HD 188101 has a global magnetic field that suppresses convection and promotes radiative diffusion of elements. However, in this star it is relatively weak for CP-class stars and is estimated to be less than 1 kG. The object belongs to the Alpha2 Canum Venaticorum (ACV) class of variable stars.

Data from the Kepler/K2 and TESS space missions confirm the presence of strictly periodic brightness variability, with an amplitude of about 0.02 magnitudes. This photometric period is exactly equal to the star's rotation period and is caused by the geometric passage of chemical inhomogeneities across the disk of the object.
