= KQ Velorum =

Binary star system in the constellation Vela

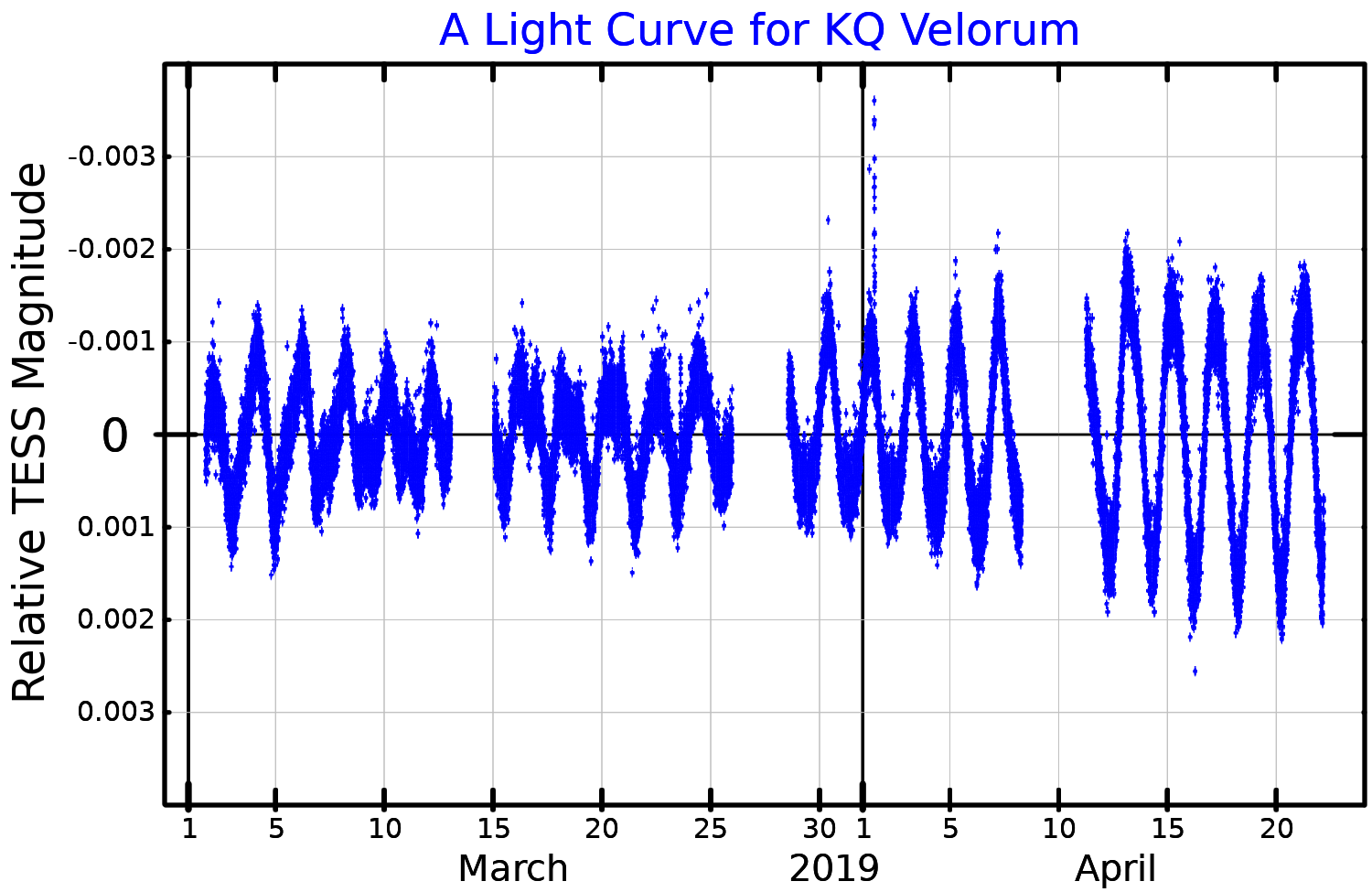
- A light curve for KQ Velorum, adapted from Schöller et al. (2020)

Observation data Epoch J2000.0 Equinox ICRS
- Constellation: Vela
- Right ascension: 10^{h} 55^{m} 01.002^{s}
- Declination: −21° 43′ 34.52″
- Apparent magnitude (V): 6.112

Characteristics
- Spectral type: Ap(SiCr); A0p EuCrSi
- B−V color index: −0.061±0.004
- Variable type: α^{2} CVn

Astrometry
Radial velocity (R_{v})	+23.4±4.0 km/s
Proper motion (μ)	RA: −36.021 mas/yr Dec.: 5.157 mas/yr
Parallax (π)	8.7507±0.1578 mas
Distance	373 ± 7 ly (114 ± 2 pc)
Absolute magnitude (M_{V})	0.24

Orbit
Period (P)	848.96±0.13 d
Semi-major axis (a)	≥ 187.3±1.2 Gm
Eccentricity (e)	0.4476±0.0049
Periastron epoch (T)	2,445,628.6±1.7 HJD
Argument of periastron (ω) (secondary)	264.5±0.8°
Semi-amplitude (K_{1}) (primary)	17.94±0.11 km/s

Details

KQ Vel A
Mass	3.0±0.2 M_{☉}
Radius	2.53±0.37 R_{☉}
Luminosity	105 L_{☉}
Surface gravity (log g)	4.18±0.20 cgs
Temperature	11,300±400 K
Rotation	2,800±200 d

Other designations
- KQ Vel, CD−41 6220, GC 15014, HD 94660, HIP 53379, HR 4263, SAO 222422, PPM 315855, G 235 G. Vel.

Database references
SIMBAD	data

KQ Velorum is a variable star system in the southern constellation of Vela. It has the identifier HD 94660 in the Henry Draper Catalogue; KQ Vel is the variable star designation. This appears as a sixth magnitude star with an apparent visual magnitude of 6.112, and thus is dimly visible to the naked eye under suitable viewing conditions. The system is located at a distance of approximately 373 light years from the Sun based on parallax measurements, and is drifting further away with a radial velocity of around 23 km/s.

This was first identified as a chemically peculiar star by Carlos and Mercedes Jaschek in 1959, who found spectral peculiarities in the silicon absorption bands. The long-term photometric variability of this star was reported by H. Hensberge in 1993, who noted a possibly complicated light curve with an estimated period on the order of 2,700 days. In 1975, E. F. Borra and J. D. Landstreet detected a strong magnetic field in excess of 1 kG on the star. Radial velocity measurements by G. Mathys and associates (1997) demonstrated this is a spectroscopic binary system.

This single-lined spectroscopic binary has a physical separation of at least 1.25 ± 0.01 AU, an orbital period of 2.32 years, and a high eccentricity (ovalness) of 0.45. The visible component is an Ap star with a stellar classification of Ap(SiCr), although the effective temperature of 11,300 K is a closer match to a spectral type of B8.5p. P. Renson and associates (1991) gave a spectral type of A0p EuCrSi, indicating the spectrum shows peculiarities in the europium, chromium, and silicon bands. It is classified as an Alpha^{2} Canum Venaticorum variable with a brightness that varies from 6.10 down to 6.12 in magnitude.

KQ Vel is a frequently-studied object that is often used as a magnetic standard star. The magnetic field of this star has a dipole strength of 7.5 kG, while displaying additional quadropole and octopole moments. It is inclined to the rotation axis by 16°. The mean longitudinal field is almost constant, showing a strength of −2 kG. The star is less than halfway through its main sequence lifespan, but is rotating very slowly with a period of around 2,800 days. It has three times the mass and 2.5 times the radius of the Sun, while radiating 105 times the Sun's luminosity.

The mass function of the system indicates that the secondary must have more than two times the mass of the Sun, yet there is no sign of it in otherwise high-quality spectra. A main sequence stellar companion of this mass would have a spectral type earlier than A5V. This led to the suggestion that this companion must be a compact object, either a black hole, a neutron star, or a pair of white dwarfs. In 2018 the companion was detected in the near infrared using the Pioneer instrument at the VLIT observatory, showing an H-band magnitude difference of 1.8±0.03 at an angular separation of 18.72±0.02 mas. This corresponds to a projected linear separation of a little over 2 AU.

X-ray observations with the Chandra X-ray Observatory in 2016 strongly suggested that the companion is a neutron star, which would make KQ Velorum the first known pair of strongly magnetic Ap star and neutron star that have been discovered. Radio emission has also been detected from the secondary object, raising the possibility that the secondary is actually itself a binary containing a magnetically active star.

If KQ Velorum B is a neutron star, the system would be the product of a supernova explosion, possibly of the electron capture type that would not significantly disrupt the orbit. The strongly magnetic Ap star would likely be the result of a merger, perhaps from an W UMa close binary. The current neutron star may have been the tertiary member of the system, and it gained mass during a Roche lobe overflow of the binary components.
