= Rapidly oscillating Ap star =

Type of variable star

Rapidly oscillating Ap stars (roAp stars) are a subtype of the Ap star class that exhibit short-timescale rapid photometric or radial velocity variations. The known periods range between 5 and 23 minutes. They lie in the δ Scuti instability strip on the main sequence.

== Discovery ==
The first roAp star to be discovered was HD 101065 (Przybylski's Star) in 1961. The oscillations were discovered by Donald Kurtz using the 20-inch (510 mm) telescope at the South African Astronomical Observatory, who saw 10–20-millimagnitude variations in the light curve of the star with a period of 12.15 minutes.

== Classification ==
The roAp stars are sometimes referred to as rapidly oscillating α^{2} Canum Venaticorum variables. Both the roAp stars and some α^{2} CVn variables lie on the δ Scuti instability strip and are magnetic chemically peculiar stars, but the roAp stars have very short periods less than an hour.

== Oscillations ==
The roAp stars oscillate in high-overtone, low-degree, non-radial pressure modes. The usual model that is used to explain the behavior of these pulsations is the oblique pulsator model. In this model the axis of pulsation is aligned with the magnetic axis, which can lead to modulation of the amplitude of the pulsation, depending on the orientation of the axis to the line of sight, as it varies with rotation. The apparent link between the magnetic axis and the pulsation axis gives clues to the nature of the driving mechanism of the pulsations. As the roAp stars seem to occupy the main sequence end of the δ Scuti instability strip, it has been suggested that the driving mechanism may be similar, i.e. the opacity mechanism operating in the hydrogen ionization zone. No standard pulsation model can be made to excite oscillations of the roAp type using the opacity mechanism. As the magnetic field appears to be important, research has taken this into account in deriving non-standard pulsation models. It has been suggested that the modes are driven by the suppression of convection by the strong magnetic field near the magnetic poles of these stars, which would account for the alignment of the pulsation axis with the magnetic axis. An instability strip for the roAp stars has been calculated, which agreed with the positions on the Hertzsprung–Russell diagram of the roAp stars discovered up to that point, but predicted the existence of longer-period pulsators among the more evolved roAp stars. Such a pulsator was discovered in HD 177765, which has the longest pulsation period of any roAp star at 23.6 minutes.

Most roAp stars have been discovered using small telescopes to observe the small changes in amplitude caused by the pulsation of the star. However, it is also possible to observe such pulsations by measuring the variations in radial velocity of sensitive lines, such as neodymium or praseodymium. Some lines are not seen to pulsate, such as iron. It is thought that the pulsations are of highest amplitude high in the atmospheres of these stars, where the density is lower. As a result, the spectral lines that are formed by elements that are radiatively levitated high in the atmosphere are likely to be most sensitive to measuring the pulsation, whereas the lines of elements such as iron, which gravitationally settle, are not expected to exhibit radial velocity variations.

== List of identified roAp stars ==
roAp stars
Star name	V magnitude	Spectral type	Period (minutes)
AP Scl, HD 6532	8.45	Ap SrEuCr	7.1
BW Cet, HD 9289	9.38	Ap SrCr	10.5
V988 Cas, HD 12098	8.07	F0	7.61
BN Cet, HD 12932	10.25	Ap SrEuCr	11.6
BT Hyi, HD 19918	9.34	Ap SrEuCr	14.5
DO Eri, HD 24712	6.00	Ap SrEu(Cr)	6.2
UV Lep, HD 42659	6.77	Ap SrCrEu	9.7
HD 60435	8.89	Ap Sr(Eu)	9.7
LX Hya, HD 80316	7.78	Ap Sr(Eu)	11.4–23.5
IM Vel, HD 83368	6.17	Ap SrEuCr	11.6
AI Ant, HD 84041	9.33	Ap SrEuCr	15.0
HD 86181	9.32	Ap Sr	6.2
HD 99563	8.16	F0	10.7
Przybylski's Star, HD 101065	7.99	controversial	12.1
HD 116114	7.02	Ap	21.3
LZ Hya, HD 119027	10.02	Ap SrEu(Cr)	8.7
PP Vir, HD 122970	8.31	unknown	11.1
Xami, α Cir, HD 128898	3.20	Ap SrEu(Cr)	6.8
HI Lib, HD 134214	7.46	Ap SrEu(Cr)	5.6
Nusakan, β CrB, HD 137909	3.68	F0p	16.2
GZ Lib, HD 137949	6.67	Ap SrEuCr	8.3
HD 150562	9.82	A/F(p Eu)	10.8
HD 154708	8.76	Ap	8.0
HD 161459	10.33	Ap EuSrCr	12.0
V694 CrA, HD 166473	7.92	Ap SrEuCr	8.8
10 Aql, HD 176232	5.89	F0p SrEu	11.6
HD 177765	9.1	Ap	23.6
HD 185256	9.94	Ap Sr(EuCr)	10.2
CK Oct, HD 190290	9.91	Ap EuSr	7.3
QR Tel, HD 193756	9.20	Ap SrCrEu	13.0
AW Cap, HD 196470	9.72	Ap SrEu(Cr)	10.8
γ Equ, HD 201601	4.68	F0p	12.4
BI Mic, HD 203932	8.82	Ap SrEu	5.9
MM Aqr, HD 213637	9.61	A(p EuSrCr)	11.5
BP Gru, HD 217522	7.53	Ap (Si)Cr	13.9
CN Tuc, HD 218495	9.36	Ap EuSr	7.4
