= HD 213637 =

Star in the constellation Aquarius

Observation data Epoch J2000.0 Equinox J2000.0
- Constellation: Aquarius
- Right ascension: 22^{h} 33^{m} 12.325^{s}
- Declination: −20° 02′ 21.88″
- Apparent magnitude (V): 9.58

Characteristics
- Evolutionary stage: main sequence
- Spectral type: A(pEuSrCr) or F1 Eu Sr Cr
- B−V color index: 0.476
- Variable type: roAp (α^{2} CVn)

Astrometry
Radial velocity (R_{v})	5.261±0.0013 km/s
Proper motion (μ)	RA: 4.685 mas/yr Dec.: 12.118 mas/yr
Parallax (π)	4.7149±0.0188 mas
Distance	692 ± 3 ly (212.1 ± 0.8 pc)

Details
Mass	1.50±0.05 M_{☉}
Radius	1.48±0.08 R_{☉}
Luminosity	5.47^{+0.09}_{−0.08} L_{☉}
Surface gravity (log g)	3.86±0.06 cgs
Temperature	7,030^{+64}_{−48} K
Metallicity [Fe/H]	+0.57 dex
Rotational velocity (v sin i)	3.5±0.5 km/s
Age	570^{+620}_{−370} Myr

Other designations
- MM Aqr, BD−20°6447, HD 213637

Database references
SIMBAD	data

HD 213637 is a solitary variable star in the zodiac constellation of Aquarius. It has the variable star designation MM Aquarii. With an apparent visual magnitude of 9.6, it is too faint to be visible to the naked eye. Based on parallax measurements, this star is located at a distance of approximately 692 light-years (212 pc) from the Earth. It is drifting further away with a line of sight velocity component of 5.3 km/s.

== Observations ==
This was identified as a chemically peculiar star by N. Houk and M. Smith-Moore in 1988. The stellar spectrum indicates strong metallicity and line blocking in the visual band, which are characteristic of rapidly oscillating Ap stars. The rapid p-mode oscillation of this star was discovered in 1997 by P. Martinez and associates. The spectrum of the measured light curve peaks at a pulsation period of 11 minutes. Pulsation amplitudes vary based on the element measured.

This roAP star presents a strong surface magnetic field. The strength of the field was measured at 740±141 G, with a surface field of 5.5 kG. The effective temperature is one of the lowest measured for a magnetic chemically peculiar star, including roAp stars. Iron peak elemental abundances appear to be at or below solar, while it is overabundant in the elements strontium, yttrium, and zirconium.

HD 213637 is an estimated 570 million years old, with 1.5 times the mass and 1.48 times the radius of the Sun. It is radiating 5.5 times the Sun's luminosity from its photosphere at an effective temperature of 7,030 K. The star appears to be rotating slowly with a projected rotational velocity of 3.5±0.5 km/s. Evolutionary models suggest this star is near or past the end of its time on the main sequence.

== See also ==
- Przybylski's Star, another cool roAP star
