= 10 Aquilae =

Star in the constellation Aquila

- Location of 10 Aquilae (circled)

Observation data Epoch J2000.0 Equinox ICRS
- Constellation: Aquila
- Right ascension: 18^{h} 58^{m} 46.92407^{s}
- Declination: +13° 54′ 23.9417″
- Apparent magnitude (V): 5.893

Characteristics
- Evolutionary stage: main sequence
- Spectral type: F0 p Sr Eu
- U−B color index: +0.100
- B−V color index: +0.257
- Variable type: roAp

Astrometry
Radial velocity (R_{v})	+14.5 km/s
Proper motion (μ)	RA: +0.238 mas/yr Dec.: −47.108 mas/yr
Parallax (π)	13.3917±0.0455 mas
Distance	243.6 ± 0.8 ly (74.7 ± 0.3 pc)
Absolute magnitude (M_{V})	+2.69

Details
Mass	1.39±0.07 M_{☉}
Radius	2.46±0.06 R_{☉}
Luminosity	17.73±0.88 L_{☉}
Surface gravity (log g)	3.8 cgs
Temperature	7,550 K
Metallicity [Fe/H]	+0.55±0.17 dex
Rotational velocity (v sin i)	+18 km/s

Other designations
- 10 Aql, V1286 Aquilae, BD+13°3838, HD 176232, HIP 93179, HR 7167, SAO 104303

Database references
SIMBAD	data

10 Aquilae (abbreviated 10 Aql) is a star in the equatorial constellation of Aquila. 10 Aquilae is the Flamsteed designation. It has an apparent visual magnitude of 5.9 and thus is a faint star that is just visible to the naked eye in dark skies. The brightness of this star is diminished by 0.17 in visual magnitude from extinction caused by interstellar gas and dust. Based on an annual parallax shift of 13.45 mas, the distance to this star is around 240 light-years (74 parsecs).

The outer envelope of this star has an effective temperature of 7,550 K, giving it the yellow-white hued glow of an F-type star. It is a type of chemically peculiar star known as an Ap star, as indicated by the 'p' in the stellar classification.

10 Aql was described as a variable star in 1973 and a period of six days was suggested. Its small amplitude, period, chemical peculiarity, and position in the H–R diagram indicated that it may be an α^{2} CVn variable and it was given this classification in the General Catalogue of Variable Stars, along with the variable star designation V1286 Aquilae. Later studies showed that the period was spurious and several very short pulsation periods were found: 11.6, 12.0, and 13.4 minutes. This indicated that 10 Aql was a member of the new rapidly oscillating Ap star class.
