= QV Andromedae =

Star in the constellation Andromeda

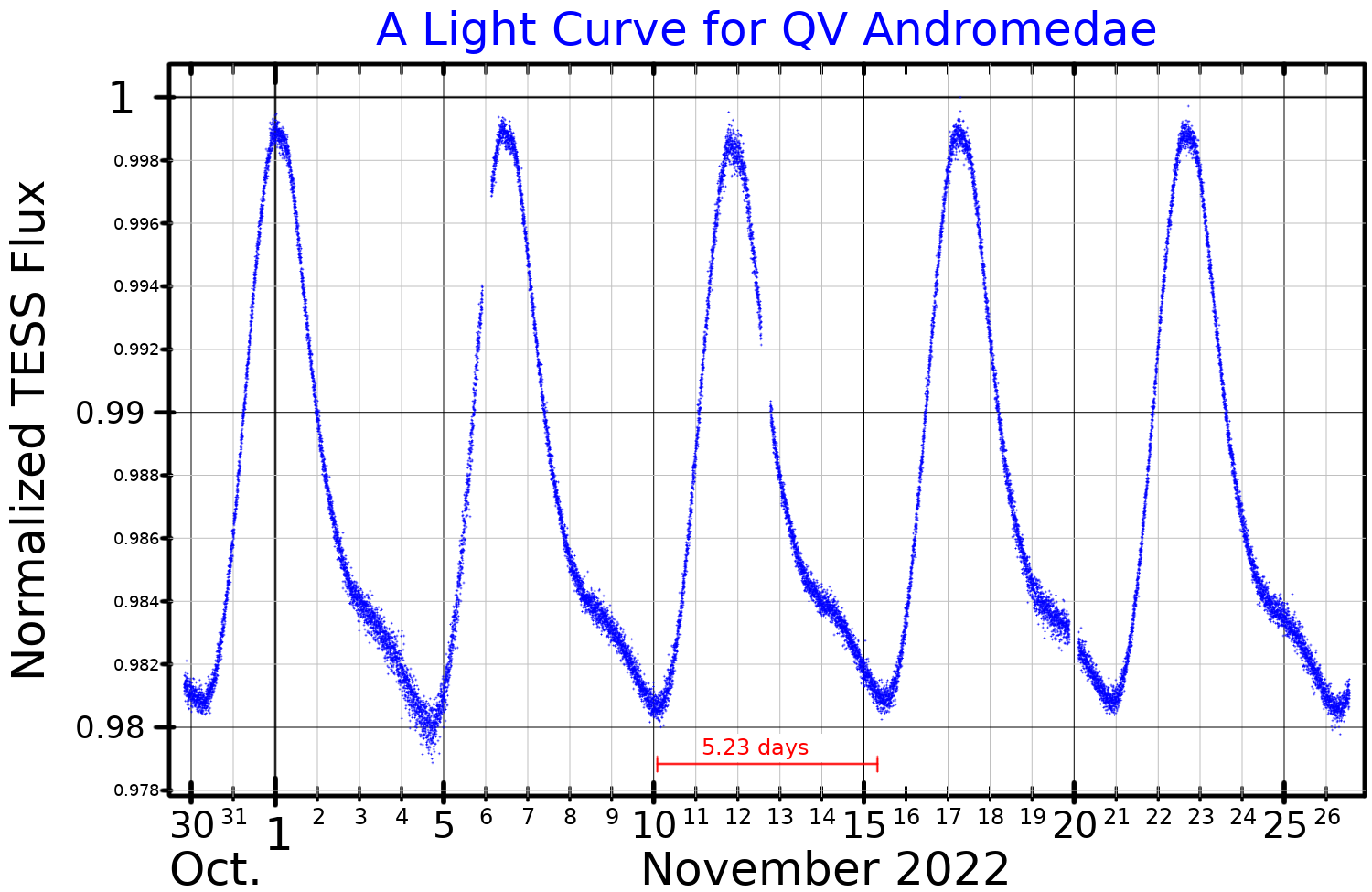
- A light curve for QV Andromedae, plotted from TESS data, with the 5.23 day rotation period shown in red

Observation data Epoch J2000 Equinox ICRS
- Constellation: Andromeda
- Right ascension: 01^{h} 16^{m} 24.4904^{s}
- Declination: +48° 04′ 56.004″
- Apparent magnitude (V): 6.608 (variable)

Characteristics
- Spectral type: B9IIIpSi
- Apparent magnitude (U): 6.23
- Apparent magnitude (B): 6.559
- Apparent magnitude (V): 6.608
- Apparent magnitude (G): 6.5628
- Apparent magnitude (J): 6.554
- Apparent magnitude (H): 6.638
- Apparent magnitude (K): 6.657
- U−B color index: −0.35
- B−V color index: −0.04335
- Variable type: α CVn

Astrometry
Radial velocity (R_{v})	−13.6±3 km/s
Proper motion (μ)	RA: 9.696±0.121 mas/yr Dec.: 2.699±0.166 mas/yr
Parallax (π)	4.4041±0.0914 mas
Distance	740 ± 20 ly (227 ± 5 pc)

Details
Mass	4.4 M_{☉}
Luminosity	266.63 L_{☉}
Surface gravity (log g)	3.541±0.039 cgs
Temperature	12384±150 K
Rotational velocity (v sin i)	49±15 km/s

Other designations
- 2MASS J01162450+4804561, BD+47 357, FK5 2085, HD 7546, HIP 5939, HR 369, SAO 37067, TYC 3268-835-1

Database references
SIMBAD	data

QV Andromedae (abbreviated to QV And, also known as HR 369 in the Bright Star Catalogue) is an Alpha^{2} Canum Venaticorum variable in the constellation Andromeda. Its maximum apparent visual magnitude is 6.6, so it can be seen by the naked eye under very favourable conditions. The brightness varies slightly following a periodic cycle of approximately 5.23 days.

The stellar classification of this star is B9IIIpSi, where the pSi suffix indicates that the star shows peculiar chemical composition with stronger than usual silicon lines. This type of star is known as an Ap star, with the chemical peculiarities caused by strong magnetic fields and slow rotation leading to chemical stratification in the atmosphere. The star is rotating at a projected rotational velocity of 49 km/s, with up to 0.05 magnitude variation of brightness during one rotation cycle. This leads to the classification of the star as an Alpha^{2} Canum Venaticorum variable.

The variability of QV Andromedae was first identified in 1975, and confirmed from Hipparcos photometry. It was assigned the variable star designation QV Andromedae in the 73rd namelist of variable stars in 1997.
