= HD 9289 =

Star in the constellation Cetus

- Location of HD 9289 (circled)

Observation data Epoch J2000.0 Equinox ICRS
- Constellation: Cetus
- Right ascension: 01^{h} 31^{m} 16.47427^{s}
- Declination: −11° 07′ 07.9356″
- Apparent magnitude (V): 9.38 (combined)

Characteristics
- Evolutionary stage: Main-sequence star
- Spectral type: A3V, A3 SrEuCr
- Apparent magnitude (K): 9.08 ± 0.03 (A), 10.77 ± 0.05 (B)
- B−V color index: 0.25
- J−H color index: 0.086
- J−K color index: 0.095
- Variable type: Rapidly oscillating Ap star

Astrometry
Radial velocity (R_{v})	11.352±0.0017 km/s
Proper motion (μ)	RA: -8.756 mas/yr Dec.: −24.435 mas/yr
Parallax (π)	3.2569±0.1379 mas
Distance	1,000 ± 40 ly (310 ± 10 pc)

Orbit
Primary	HD 9289 A
Name	HD 9289 B
Semi-major axis (a)	0.441±0.003″

Details
Luminosity	8.7+1.5 −1.3 L_{☉}
Surface gravity (log g)	4.50±0.20 cgs
Temperature	8710+410 −392, 7750 K
Rotation	8.660±0.006 d
Rotational velocity (v sin i)	10.50 km/s

Other designations
- BW Ceti, BD−11° 286, HD 9289, SAO 147854, PPM 210286, TIC 136842396, TYC 5274-240-1, GSC 05274-00240, 2MASS J01311648-1107078, Gaia DR2 2458519750738240768, Gaia DR3 2458519755033679360

Database references
SIMBAD	data

HD 9289 is a white-hued variable star in the constellation of Cetus. It has the variable-star designation BW Ceti (abbreviated to BW Cet). With an apparent magnitude of 9.38, it is too faint to be observed by the naked eye from Earth. It is located at a distance of approximately 1,000 light-years (310 parsecs) according to Gaia EDR3 parallax measurements, and is moving away from the Solar System at a heliocentric radial velocity of 11.352 km/s.

== Stellar properties ==
HD 9289 is an A-type main-sequence star with the spectral type A3 SrEuCr. The suffix indicates that the star shows strong spectral lines of strontium, europium, and chromium, characteristic of an Ap star. The star radiates roughly 8.7 times the luminosity of the Sun from its photosphere. It possesses a magnetic field with a strength of 2.0 kG, which is 3,000–9,000 times stronger than Earth's magnetic field (0.22–0.67 G).

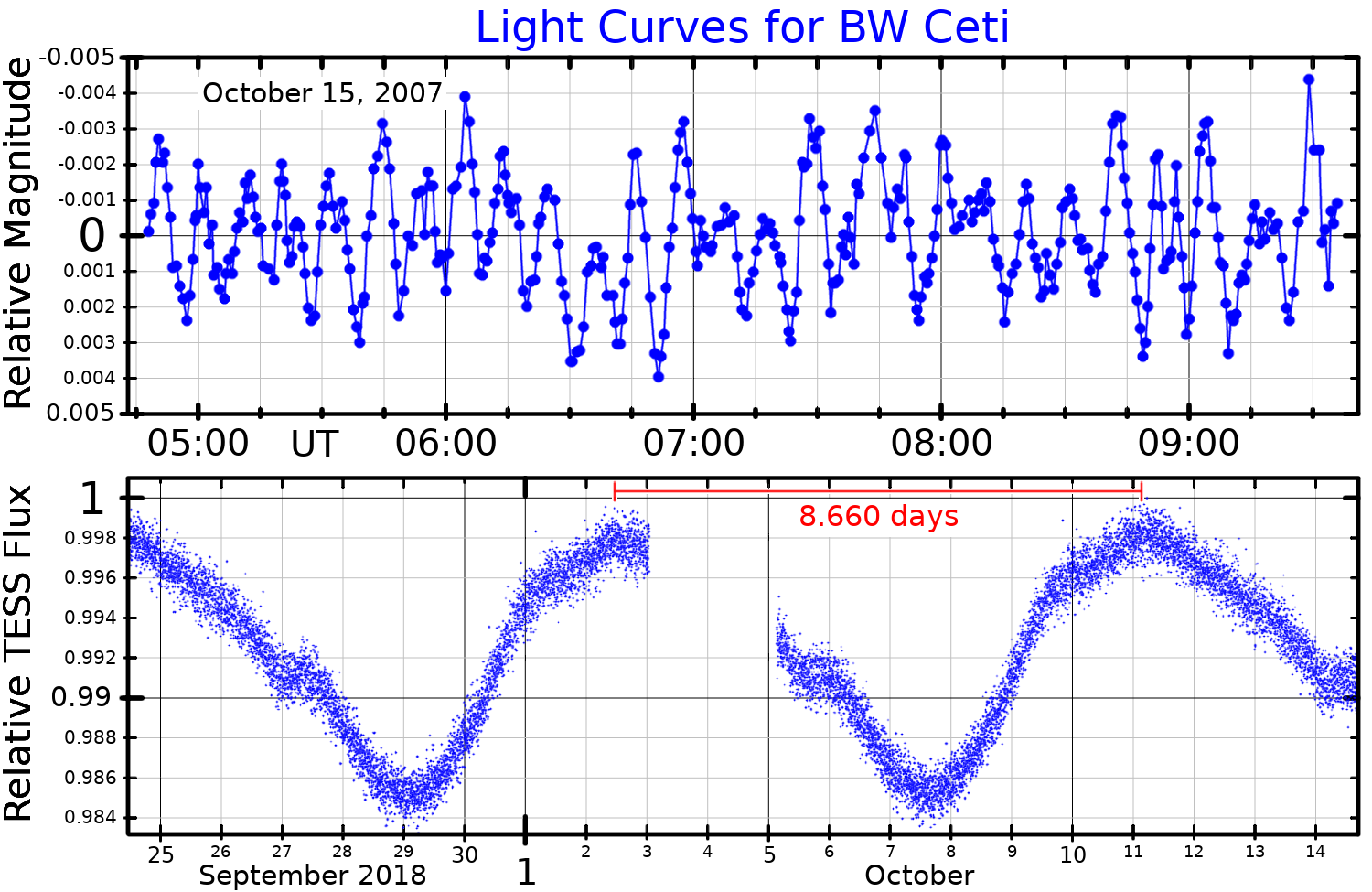
Light curves for BW Ceti. The upper plot, adapted from Gruberbauer et al. shows the short timescale variability, and the lower plot of TESS data shows the longer timescale variability, with the rotation period marked in red.

The star was first classified as a rapidly oscillating Ap star (roAp) in 1993 by Kurtz et al. when it was found to pulsate at multiple periods, all clustered around 10.5 minutes (1585.06 μHz). Additional observations confirmed the presence of rotational amplitude modulation, similar to that of the well-studied roAp star HR 1217. In 2011, a new set of pulsation frequencies were discovered, the strongest of them being at 1585.936 μHz with an amplitude of 0.63 mmag. Few of them were consistent with the initial reports, however, which was explained by the fact that the measurements by Kurtz et al. were affected by aliasing that caused misidentifications, though an innate shift in the star's pulsation behavior could not be ruled out.

In 2012, the rotational period of HD 9289 was constrained to 8.55±0.08 d through differential photometry observations. This was revised slightly upward in 2021 to 8.660±0.006 d.

== Binary companion ==
In 2012, a previously undetected visual companion was discovered at a separation of 0.441 arcseconds to the east-northeast of HD 9289. The probability that the two stars are unrelated and aligned by chance is very low (2.16×10^{−4} %), therefore the pair are most certainly part of a wide binary system. The secondary star is about 1.70 magnitudes fainter than the primary when observed in the K band.
