= HR 1217 =

Star in the constellation Eridanus

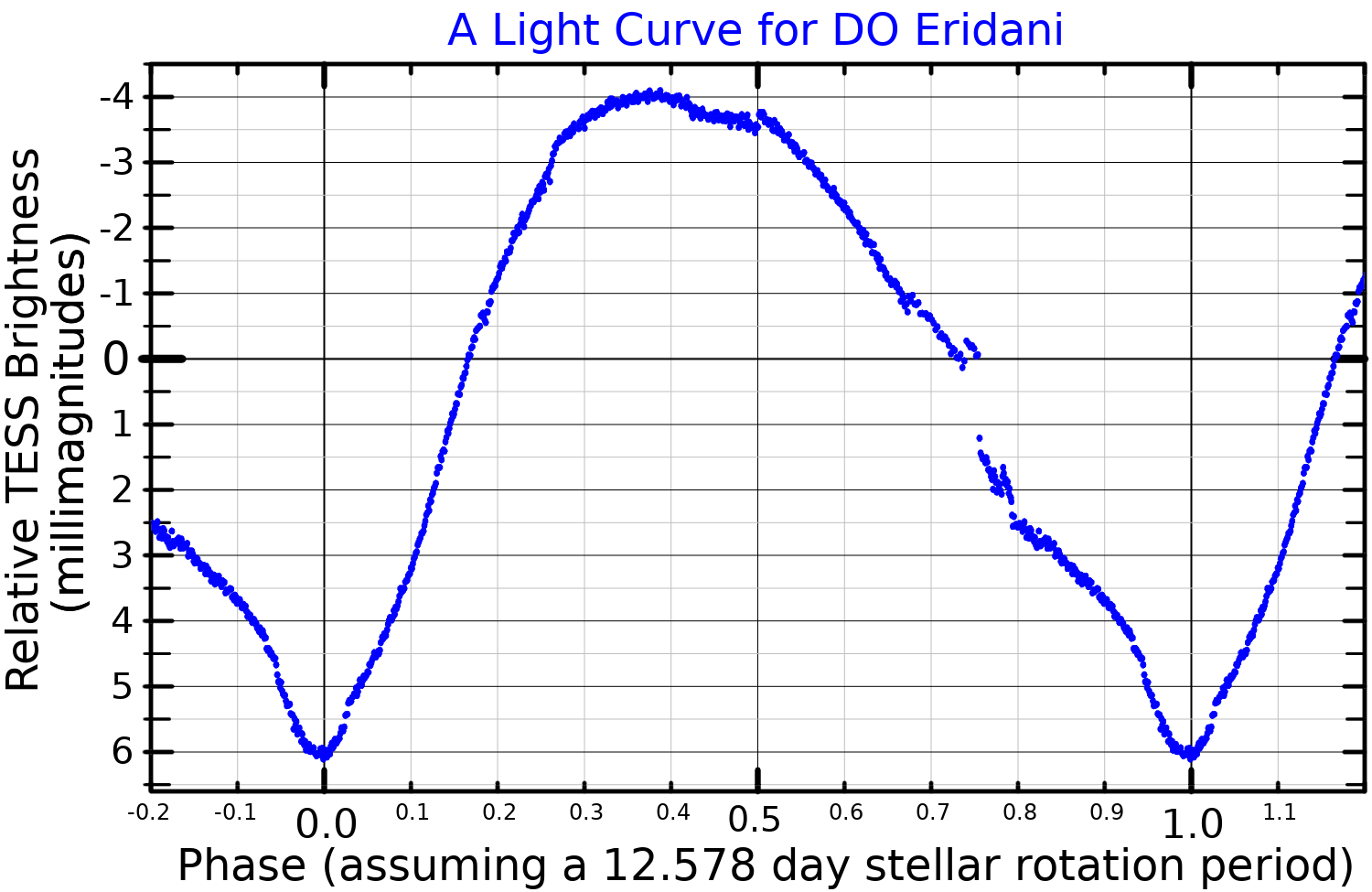
- A light curve for DO Eridani, adapted from Holdsworth et al. (2021)

Observation data Epoch J2000 Equinox ICRS
- Constellation: Eridanus
- Right ascension: 03^{h} 55^{m} 16.13133^{s}
- Declination: −12° 05′ 56.7277″
- Apparent magnitude (V): 5.97 - 6.00

Characteristics
- Evolutionary stage: main sequence
- Spectral type: A9Vp SrEuCr
- Variable type: roAp

Astrometry
Proper motion (μ)	RA: −91.357±0.036 mas/yr Dec.: −28.376±0.036 mas/yr
Parallax (π)	20.7432±0.0413 mas
Distance	157.2 ± 0.3 ly (48.21 ± 0.10 pc)
Absolute magnitude (M_{V})	2.32

Details
Mass	1.54±0.13 M_{☉}
Radius	1.75±0.05 R_{☉}
Luminosity	7.6±1.2 L_{☉}
Surface gravity (log g)	4.30 cgs
Temperature	7,235±280 K
Metallicity [Fe/H]	−0.36 dex
Rotation	12.46 d
Rotational velocity (v sin i)	7.0 km/s
Age	780+760 −470 Myr

Other designations
- HD 24712, HIP 18339, HR 1217, SAO 149251, 2MASS J03551613-1205567

Database references
SIMBAD	data

HR 1217 is a variable star in the constellation Eridanus. It has the variable star designation DO Eridani, but this seldom appears in the astronomical literature; it is usually called either HR 1217 or HD 24712. At its brightest, HR 1217 has an apparent magnitude of 5.97, making it very faintly visible to the naked eye for an observer with excellent dark-sky conditions.

HR 1217 is one of the best-studied rapidly oscillating Ap (roAp) stars. Inspired by the 1978 discovery of the rapid (12 minute period) brightness variability of Przybylski's Star (an Ap star), in 1980 D. W. Kurtz observed the Ap star HR 1217, and found clear 6.15 minute oscillations, the amplitude of which slowly changed over the course of several days. The next year, high-speed photometric observations of the star revealed six nearly equally spaced pulsation periods ranging from 6.126 minutes (strongest) to 5.966 minutes (weakest). In 1989 it was found that the amplitudes of these pulsations are modulated over a period equal to the star's rotation period. By 2019, ten pulsation frequencies had been found in the TESS data.

HR 1217 is a chemically peculiar star, with particular over-abundances of copper, europium, and chromium in its spectrum. At the same time, lines of other metals such as iron are less strong than expected for an A9 star, which is typical of an Ap star. In 2009, Shulyak et al. computed a model atmosphere for the star which showed how the elemental abundances varied as a function of atmospheric height. In 2015, doppler imaging was used to produce maps of both the star's magnetic field and the distribution of several chemical elements across the star's surface. It was the first roAp star to be mapped in this way.
