= GR Andromedae =

Variable star in the constellation Andromeda

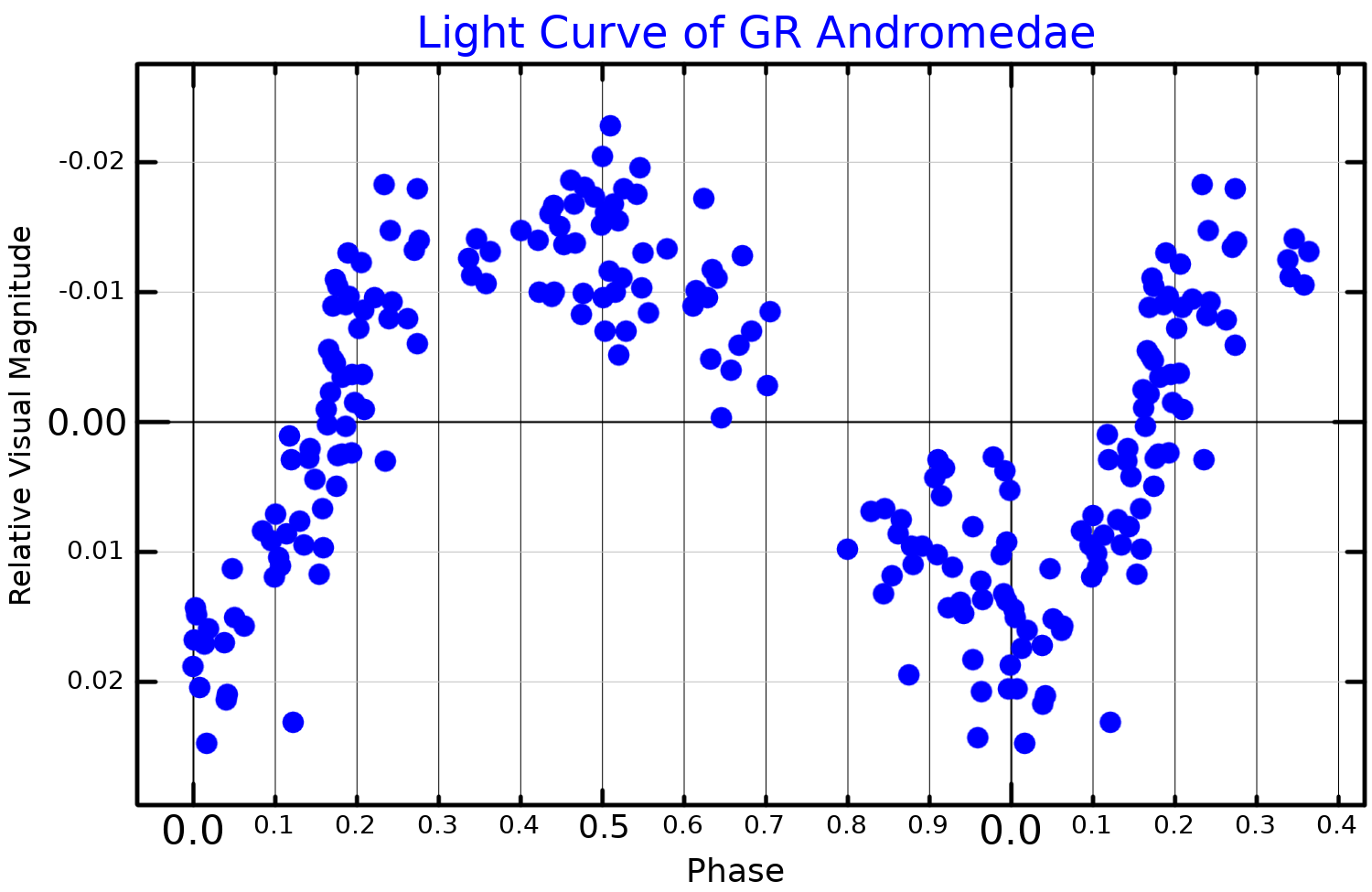
- The visual band light curve of GR Andromedae, showing variation about the mean brightness. Adapted from Pyper et al. (2017)

Observation data Epoch J2000 Equinox ICRS
- Constellation: Andromeda
- Right ascension: 00^{h} 28^{m} 28.5694^{s}
- Declination: +32° 26′ 15.876″
- Apparent magnitude (V): 6.87 – 6.95 variable

Characteristics
- Evolutionary stage: main sequence
- Spectral type: A2pSrCrEu
- Apparent magnitude (B): 6.99
- Apparent magnitude (V): 6.91
- Apparent magnitude (G): 6.8449
- Apparent magnitude (J): 6.708
- Apparent magnitude (H): 6.765
- Apparent magnitude (K): 6.739
- Variable type: α^{2} CVn

Astrometry
Radial velocity (R_{v})	−18.2±0.7 km/s
Proper motion (μ)	RA: −28.947±0.032 mas/yr Dec.: −20.114±0.026 mas/yr
Parallax (π)	5.7439±0.0306 mas
Distance	568 ± 3 ly (174.1 ± 0.9 pc)
Absolute magnitude (M_{V})	+0.88

Details
Mass	2.24 M_{☉}
Radius	2.24 R_{☉}
Luminosity	37 L_{☉}
Surface gravity (log g)	3 cgs
Temperature	8,542 K
Metallicity [Fe/H]	1 dex
Rotation	518.2 days
Rotational velocity (v sin i)	< 6 km/s
Age	525 Myr

Other designations
- 2MASS J00282858+3226159, BD+31 59, HD 2453, HIP 2243, SAO 53921, TYC 2266-725-1

Database references
SIMBAD	data

GR Andromedae (often abbreviated to GR And) is a variable star in the constellation Andromeda. Its apparent visual magnitude varies between 6.87 and 6.95 in a cycle of 518.2 days. It is classified as an α^{2} Canum Venaticorum variable.

== Spectrum ==
The radiation emitted by GR Andromedae is a typical stellar blackbody with absorption lines from various elements, which gives to the star a spectral type A2pSrCrEu, meaning that unusually strong lines of strontium, chromium and europium can be observed. GR Andromedae is thus classified as an Ap star. The intensity and profile of the spectral lines varies within a cycle with the same period as the brightness variations.

== Variability ==
Photometric and spectral variability of GR Andromedae is typical of a star with a strong and variable magnetic field. This way, the 518.2 days periodicity can be identified as the rotation period of the star. It's among the slowest rotators in the category of magnetic chemically peculiar stars, with a calculated equatorial rotation rate of only 0.2 km/s.
