= 53 Camelopardalis =

Star in the constellation Camelopardalis

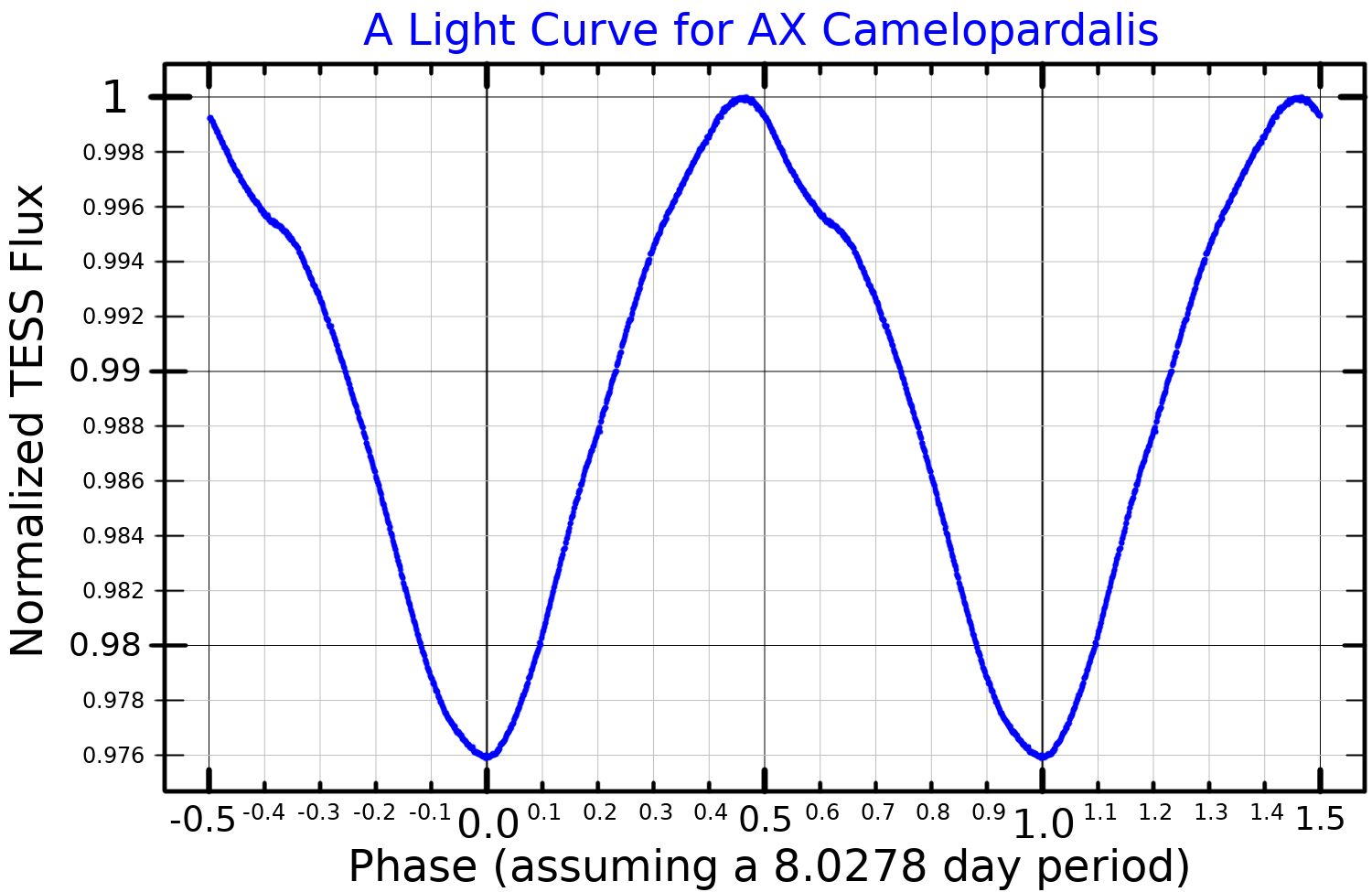
- A light curve for AX Camelopardalis, plotted from TESS data

Observation data Epoch J2000.0 Equinox ICRS
- Constellation: Camelopardalis
- Right ascension: 08^{h} 01^{m} 42.44039^{s}
- Declination: +60° 19′ 27.8068″
- Apparent magnitude (V): 6.02 (6.3 + 7.5)

Characteristics
- Evolutionary stage: main sequence
- Spectral type: A3VpSrSiCrEu
- B−V color index: 0.158±0.005
- Variable type: α^{2} CVn

Astrometry
Radial velocity (R_{v})	−2.2 km/s
Proper motion (μ)	RA: −25.627 mas/yr Dec.: −26.731 mas/yr
Parallax (π)	11.2405±0.2219 mas
Distance	290 ± 6 ly (89 ± 2 pc)
Absolute magnitude (M_{V})	1.05

Orbit
Period (P)	6.6504±0.0089
Semi-major axis (a)	0.055±0.018″
Eccentricity (e)	0.706±0.024
Inclination (i)	55.4±2.9°
Longitude of the node (Ω)	118.3±20.1°
Periastron epoch (T)	2001.2281±0.025
Argument of periastron (ω) (secondary)	8.3±1.8°
Semi-amplitude (K_{1}) (primary)	12.08±0.45 km/s

Details

53 Cam A
Mass	2.074±0.012 M_{☉}
Radius	2.36±0.10 R_{☉}
Luminosity	24.9±1.15 L_{☉}
Surface gravity (log g)	3.70±0.10 cgs
Temperature	8,400±150 K
Rotation	8.02681±0.00004 d
Rotational velocity (v sin i)	12.5±0.5 km/s
Age	615+56 −51 Myr

Other designations
- 53 Cam, AX Cam, BD+60°1105, FK5 302, GC 10822, HD 65339, HIP 39261, HR 3109, SAO 14402, CCDM 08017+6019, WDS J08017+6019

Database references
SIMBAD	data

53 Camelopardalis is a binary star system in the northern circumpolar constellation of Camelopardalis, located 290 light-years away from the Sun as determined by parallax measurements. It has the variable star designation AX Camelopardalis; 53 Camelopardalis is the Flamsteed designation. This object is dimly visible to the naked eye as a white hued star with a baseline apparent visual magnitude of +6.02. It is a single-lined spectroscopic binary system with an orbital period of 6.63 years and a high eccentricity of about 0.7. The "a sin i" value of the primary is 280 Gm (1.9 AU), where a is the semimajor axis and i is the orbital inclination.

The visible component is a well-studied magnetic Ap star with a stellar classification of A3VpSrSiCrEu and a visual magnitude of 6.3. The magnetic field topology of 53 Camelopardalis is complex, and is accompanied by abundance variations across the surface of elements like silicon, calcium, titanium, iron, and neodymium.

Tadeusz Jarzębowski discovered that 53 Camelopardalis is a variable star, in 1960. It is classified as an Alpha^{2} Canum Venaticorum type variable star and the combined brightness of the system varies from magnitude +6.00 down to +6.05 with a rotationally modulated period of 8.0278 days.

The primary has 2.1 times the mass of the Sun and 2.4 times the Sun's radius. It is spinning with a projected rotational velocity of 12.5 km/s and a rotation period of 8.0268 days. The inclination angle of the pole is estimated to be 57°±5°. The star is about 615 million years old and is radiating 25 times the luminosity of the Sun from its photosphere at an effective temperature of 8,400 K.
