= GY Andromedae =

Variable star in the constellation Andromeda

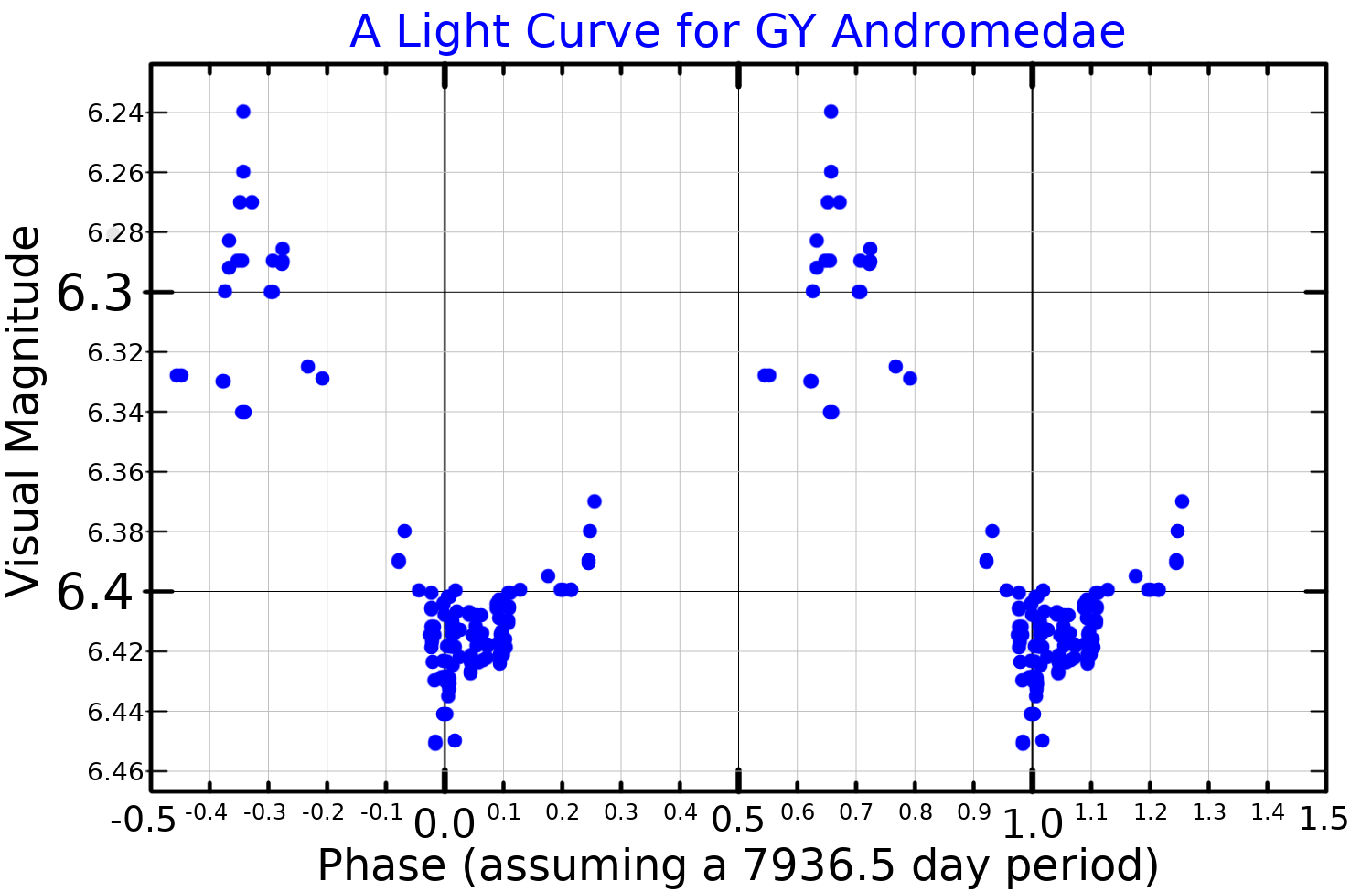
- A visual-band light curve for GY Andromedae, adapted from Metlova et al. (2014)

Observation data Epoch J2000 Equinox ICRS
- Constellation: Andromeda
- Right ascension: 01^{h} 38^{m} 31.82552^{s}
- Declination: +45° 23′ 58.9357″
- Apparent magnitude (V): 6.36

Characteristics
- Spectral type: B9 pe
- U−B color index: -0.10
- B−V color index: +0.04
- Variable type: α^{2} CVn

Astrometry
Radial velocity (R_{v})	+3.0 km/s
Proper motion (μ)	RA: −17.292(211) mas/yr Dec.: −1.386(150) mas/yr
Parallax (π)	7.1093±0.1589 mas
Distance	460 ± 10 ly (141 ± 3 pc)
Absolute magnitude (M_{V})	+0.68

Details
Mass	2.47 ± 0.15 M_{☉}
Radius	2.6 ± 0.4 R_{☉}
Luminosity	52 L_{☉}
Surface gravity (log g)	4.01 ± 0.14 cgs
Temperature	10,723 K
Metallicity [Fe/H]	0.86 dex
Rotational velocity (v sin i)	31 km/s

Orbit
Name	GY And B
Period (P)	272.99 days
Semi-major axis (a)	> 0.25 AU
Eccentricity (e)	0.47
Argument of periastron (ω) (secondary)	17.7°

Other designations
- BD +44°341, HD 9996, HIP 7651, HR 465, SAO 37393, PPM 44258

Database references
SIMBAD	data

GY Andromedae (GY And) is an α^{2} Canum Venaticorum-type binary variable star in the northern constellation Andromeda. Its brightness fluctuates in visual magnitude between 6.27^{m} and 6.41^{m}, making it a challenge to view with the naked eye even in good seeing conditions. The magnetic activity on this star shows an unusually long period of variability, cycling about once every 23 years. Based upon parallax measurements, this star is located at a distance of about 460 light-years (140 parsecs) from the Earth.

This is classified as an Ap/Bp star, with a peculiar spectrum showing lines of chromium and europium that change in intensity over a period matching the variability cycle, although opposite in phase. Its most striking characteristic is the presence of the unstable element promethium in its emission spectrum. All isotopes of this element are radioactive with half-lives of 17.7 years or less. The promethium in the outer envelope may be generated by the spontaneous fission of higher-mass transuranic elements.

== System ==
Based on radial velocity measurements taken at the Dominion Astrophysical Observatory between 1927 and 1935 Canadian astronomer William Edmund Harper strongly suspected that this star was a spectroscopic binary. In 1958, American astronomer Horace W. Babcock confirmed the binary nature of the star. It has an orbital period of 273 days with a large eccentricity of 0.47. The two components are separated by an estimated distance of at least 37.4 million km, or 0.25 astronomical units.
