= HD 215441 =

Variable star in the constellation Lacerta

Observation data Epoch J2000.0 Equinox ICRS
- Constellation: Lacerta
- Right ascension: 22^{h} 44^{m} 07.505^{s}
- Declination: +55° 35′ 21.211″
- Apparent magnitude (V): 8.73 to 8.90

Characteristics
- Spectral type: B8p(Si) or A0p
- B−V color index: 0.031±0.015
- Variable type: α^{2} CVn

Astrometry
Radial velocity (R_{v})	−5.5±0.15 km/s
Proper motion (μ)	RA: 4.523 mas/yr Dec.: −1.244 mas/yr
Parallax (π)	2.1702±0.0201 mas
Distance	1,500 ± 10 ly (461 ± 4 pc)

Details
Mass	3.9±0.1 M_{☉}
Radius	2.6 R_{☉}
Luminosity	204+47 −38 L_{☉}
Temperature	14,500±400 K
Rotation	9.487792±0.000049 d
Rotational velocity (v sin i)	5 km/s

Other designations
- Babcock's Star, GL Lac, BD+54°2846, HD 215441, HIP 112247, SAO 34741, PPM 41007

Database references
SIMBAD	data

HD 215441 is a peculiar variable star in the northern constellation of Lacerta. Alternatively, it is known as Babcock's Star and has the variable star designation GL Lac. The apparent visual magnitude of this star varies from 8.73 to 8.90 over a period of 9.4871 days, which is too faint to be viewed with the naked eye. Based on parallax measurements, it is located at a distance of approximately 1,500 light years.

== Observations ==
This was classified as a peculiar A-type star in the Henry Draper Catalogue. In 1960, American astronomer Horace W. Babcock decided to measure the magnetic field of HD 215441 using the Zeeman effect, and found an unusually strong field. The spectra demonstrated a mean field strength of 34,400±266 gauss. Light curve measurements showed a regular luminosity variation with a period of 9.49 days and an amplitude of 0.140 in magnitude. The magnetic field was found to vary periodically and in phase with the light variations.

The spectrum of this peculiar star shows an anomalous abundance of silicon. Its absorption lines are very sharp, with a projected rotational velocity measured at under 6 km/s. The strength of lines were found to vary by up to 120% over the course of a period. Using an oblique rotator model, the variation of the magnetic field was found to fit an off center dipole tilted at an angle of around 35 degrees relative to the pole of rotation. Abundance concentrations in the stellar atmosphere were found not to vary over an observation period of 16 years, and there is no significant activity or pulsations. Zeeman–Doppler imaging of this star demonstrated that abundance anomalies are dependent on the orientation of the magnetic field lines.

This is a magnetic silicon-rich star with a stellar classification of B8p(Si) or A0p. It is classified as a α^{2} Canum Venaticorum variable, which is a class of chemically peculiar stars of type CP2. The star has 3.9 times the mass of the Sun and radiates over 200 times the Sun's luminosity from its photosphere at an effective temperature of 14,500 K. It spins on its axis with a period of 9.5 days. It has one of the largest magnetic fields among Ap stars; the dipole magnetic field has a strength of 62 kG and it is inclined at an angle of 37° relative to the rotation axis. The star is a weak source of X-ray emission.

== Sources ==
- Adelman, S. J. (March 1983), "Spectrophotometry of peculiar B and A stars. XIV. 56 Arietis, 41 Tauri, 25 Sextantis, HD 170973, HD 205087, and HD 215441", Astronomy and Astrophysics, Supplement Series, 51: 511–531, Bibcode:1983A&AS...51..511A.
- Goossens, M.; et al. (April 1982), "The magnetic field surface structure of HD 215441", Astrophysics and Space Science, 83 (1–2): 213–224, Bibcode:1982Ap&SS..83..213G, doi:10.1007/BF00648555.
- Leckrone, D. S. (June 1974), "Ultraviolet photometry from the Orbiting Astronomical Observatory. XV. The strongly magnetic variable HD 215441", Astrophysical Journal, 190: 319–326, Bibcode:1974ApJ...190..319L, doi:10.1086/152879.
- Kemp, James C.; Wolstencroft, Ramon D. (January 1973), "HD 215441 and 53 Camelopardalis: Intrinsic Polarization of Hβ and the Continuum", Astrophysical Journal, 179: L33, Bibcode:1973ApJ...179L..33K, doi:10.1086/181111.
