= HR 3831 =

Binary star system in the constellation Vela

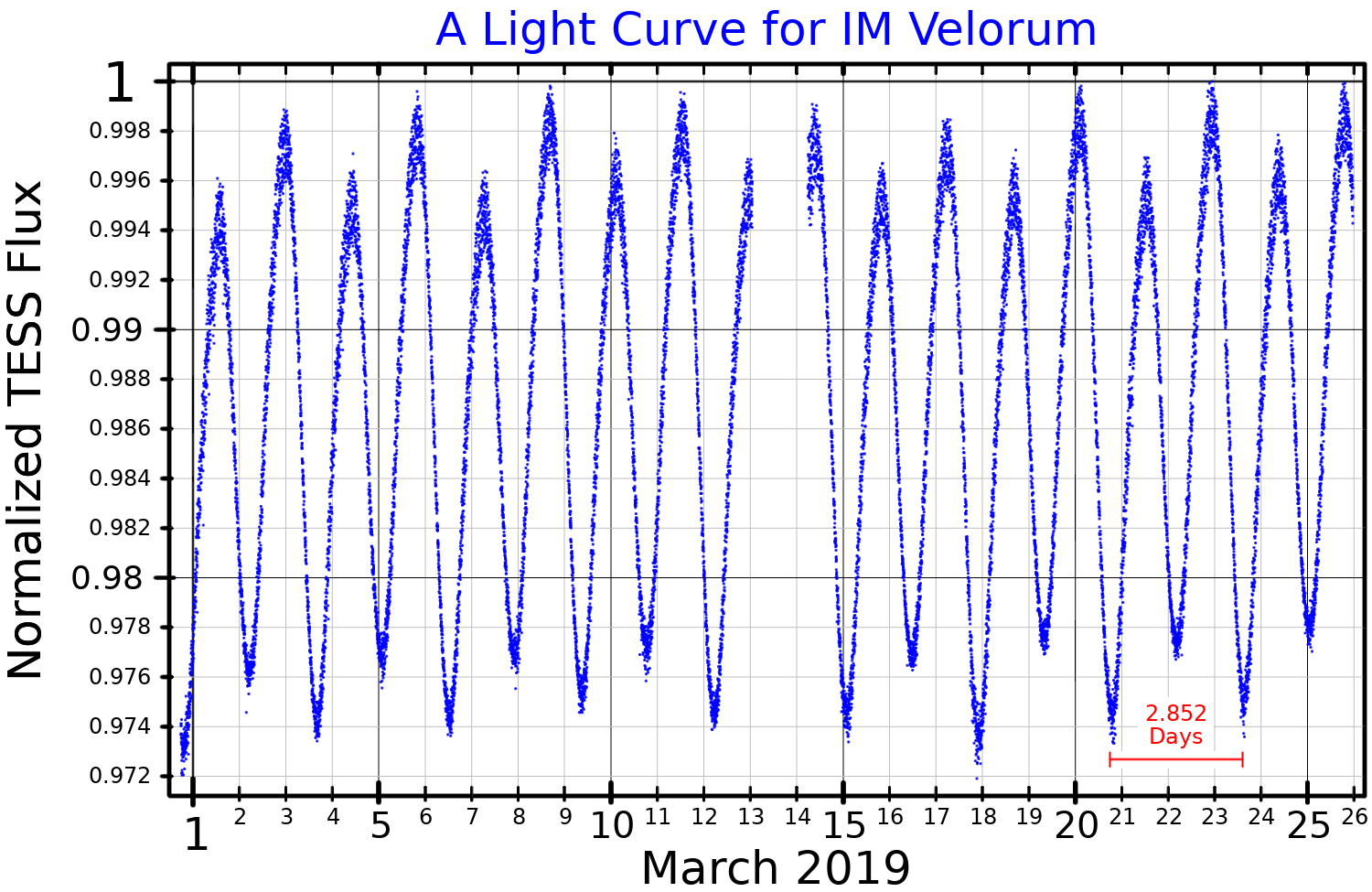
- A light curve for IM Velorum (HR 3831), plotted from TESS data. The 2.852 day period is shown in red.

Observation data Epoch J2000 Equinox ICRS
- Constellation: Vela
- HD 83368A
- Right ascension: 09^{h} 36^{m} 25.4255^{s}
- Declination: −48° 45′ 04.240″
- Apparent magnitude (V): 6.23
- HD 83368B
- Right ascension: 09^{h} 36^{m} 25.3660^{s}
- Declination: −48° 45′ 07.505″
- Apparent magnitude (V): 10.31

Characteristics

HD 83368A
- Evolutionary stage: main sequence
- Spectral type: A8VSrCrEu
- Variable type: Rapidly oscillating Ap

HD 83368B
- Spectral type: F9V

Astrometry

HD 83368A
Proper motion (μ)	RA: −8.16±0.03 mas/yr Dec.: −18.85±0.03 mas/yr
Parallax (π)	14.01±0.03 mas
Distance	232.8 ± 0.5 ly (71.4 ± 0.2 pc)

HD 83368B
Radial velocity (R_{v})	−4.0±0.3 km/s
Proper motion (μ)	RA: −9.41±0.19 mas/yr Dec.: −14.00±0.17 mas/yr
Parallax (π)	14.31±0.15 mas
Distance	228 ± 2 ly (69.9 ± 0.7 pc)

Details

Aa
Mass	1.78^{+0.12}_{−0.17} M_{☉}
Radius	2.003 R_{☉}
Luminosity (bolometric)	12.33 L_{☉}
Surface gravity (log g)	4.2 cgs
Temperature	7650 K
Rotation	2.851976±0.00003 d
Rotational velocity (v sin i)	33.8±1.0 km/s
Age	0.93^{+0.42}_{−0.34} Gyr

Ab
Mass	0.64 M_{☉}
Radius	0.60 R_{☉}
Temperature	4,175 K

B
Mass	1 M_{☉}

Other designations
- CD−48 4831, HD 83368, HIP 47145, HR 3831, SAO 221339, GSC 08176-00283, IM Vel
- HD 83368A: 2MASS J09362541-4845042, TYC 8176-283-1
- HD 83368B: 2MASS J09362537-4845072, Gaia DR2 5410092611662456704, TYC 8176-2818-1

Database references
SIMBAD	data

HR 3831, also known as HD 83368, is a triple star system in the southern constellation of Vela at a distance of 233 light years. This object is barely visible to the naked eye as a dim, blue star with an apparent visual magnitude of 6.232. It is approaching the Earth with a heliocentric radial velocity of 4.0±0.3 km/s.

The star system is a hierarchical binary, made up of an inner and an outer pair. The inner pair has an orbital separation of 13 astronomical units, and contain the primary star, HR 3831 Aa, and the secondary HR 3831 Ab. The outer component have a 214 AU projected separation from the inner pair. The primary star, HR 3831 Aa, is a pulsating variable of a rapidly oscillating Ap type. It has a single yet strongly distorted dipole pulsation mode with a frequency of 1427 μHz. The primary star is chemically peculiar, exhibiting spots of enhanced concentrations of lithium, europium and oxygen.

The star's variability was discovered by Pierre Renson, and announced in 1977. It was given its variable star designation, IM Velorum, in 1981.

== See also ==
- Vela (Chinese astronomy)
