= Carlos Jaschek =

French astrophysicist (1926–1999)

- Born: Karl Otto Rüdiger Jaschek (Note: The Guggenheim Foundation gives his second name as "Oton" instead of "Otto".); March 2, 1926; Brieg, Germany; now part of Brzeg, Poland
- Died: April 12, 1999 (aged 73)
- Education: National University of La Plata, Argentina
- Known for: stellar spectroscopy, photometry (astronomy) and classification, astronomical statistics, nomenclature and databases, and cultural astronomy; leading the CDS in its early years.
- Spouse: Mercedes Jaschek (April 13, 1926 – November 21, 1995; her death)
- Scientific career
- Fields: astrophysicist, astronomer, data analyst
- Workplaces: National University of La Plata, Perkins Observatory, Yerkes Observatory, Cordoba Observatory, Ohio State University, University of Geneva, Louis Pasteur University

Carlos Jaschek (March 2, 1926 – April 12, 1999) was a German-born Argentine astrophysicist who spent time in the United States, lived in Switzerland, settled in France, became a French citizen and worked to make astronomical data accessible to all nations. As the second Director of a new center in Strasbourg, France, designed to be a computerized repository for data about the stars, he was part of its early team who were determined, clearsighted decision-makers when its resources were limited.

Jaschek began in astronomy at La Plata, in South America, later directing its Astrophysics Department. He travelled and conducted research at many observatories along with his wife, the stellar astronomer and spectroscopist Mercedes Jaschek, with whom he spent a lifetime collaborating in research. They lived in Argentina from 1937 to 1973. With his wife and his other colleagues, Jaschek was involved with both stellar spectroscopy and photometry, the newly-accessible infrared(IR) and ultraviolet (UV) as well as visible light, astronomical statistics and guidelines for designating stars, and with the chemically peculiar stars

In addition to his research discoveries, he co-created atlases and catalogues and published them. He was President of the International Astronomical Union's Commission 45 Stellar Classification. and was an early proponent of creating astronomical databases.

He founded an organization to encourage research on the impact of astronomy on society, the SEAC. The Jaschek's retired in 1993 and moved to Spain, continuing to be active in scientific endeavors. Mercedes Jaschek died in 1995, and Carlos Jaschek in 1999.

== Career ==
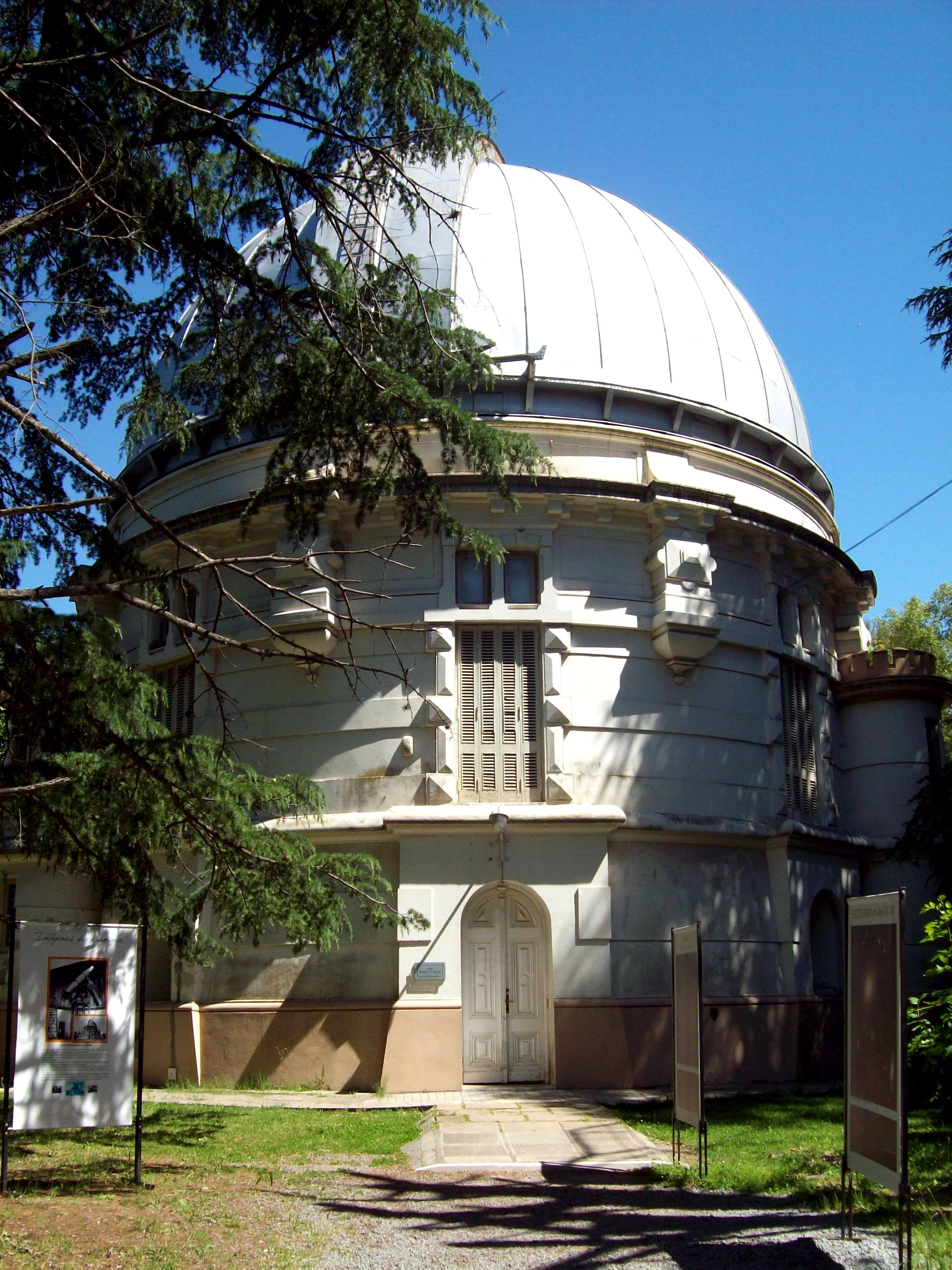
The Observatory at La Plata, Argentina. The Jascheks started here, and left Argentina in 1973.

Jaschek was born on March 2, 1926, in Brieg, Germany, (now Brzeg, Poland). His family moved to Argentina in South America when he was 11. In 1947, he was hired at La Plata Observatory. His wife, Mercedes Isabel Corvalán de Jaschek, was an Argentine stellar spectroscopist, who also began at the National University of La Plata in 1947. The pair collaborated throughout their lives. Carlos Jaschek received his Ph.D. in astronomy in 1952.

After a year in the United States, he became professor in astrophysics at La Plata University and the director of the Astrophysical Department in 1957. Jaschek's initial research at La Plata involved observing minor planets. He began programs in stellar spectroscopy and worked to develop equipment particularly in photoelectric photometry. He was also involved with Argentina's fledgling radio astronomy and space program. In 1972, he organized the first astrophysics conference in Latin America.

From 1957 to 1973, Jaschek made contacts with other spectroscopists, creating lifelong collaborations with astronomers in other nations when he travelled to observatories and astronomy departments including Yerkes Observatory, Perkins Observatory, Ohio State University, the University of Michigan and elsewhere. He was Invited Professor at Perkins Observatory in 1964 and 1967, and also at the University of Chicago (Yerkes) as a research associate in 1967. He was invited professor at the Argentine National Observatory at Córdoba in 1968. In 1970, he was invited professor at Cordoba, Ohio State University, and at Geneva University. Mercedes Jaschek also conducted research at Cordoba, Perkins, Yerkes, Michigan and Geneva.

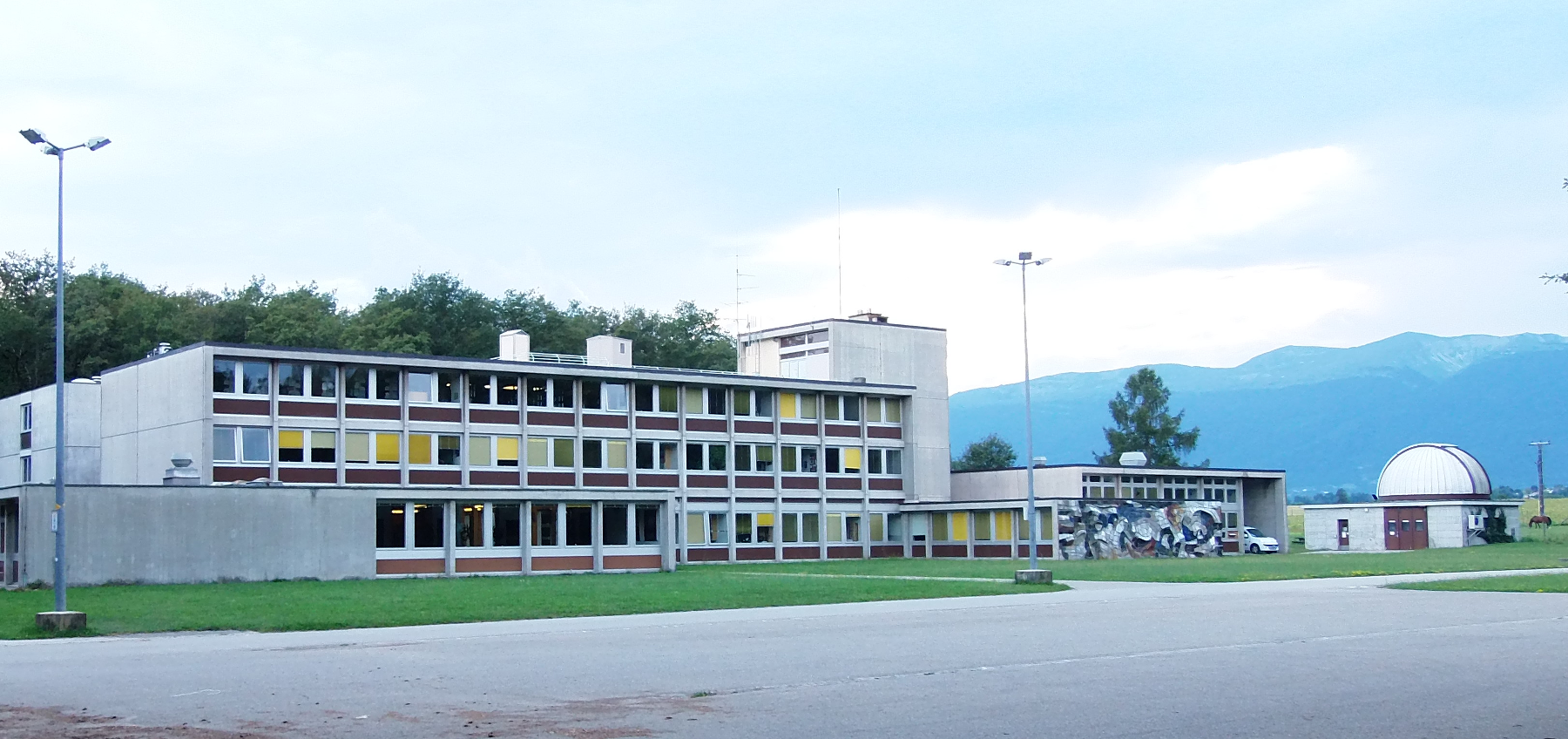
The Jascheks were in Geneva, Switzerland in 1970 and 1973. Geneva Observatory is the rounded building on the right.

From 1970 to 1973, Jaschek was the vice president of the International Astronomical Union's (IAU) Commission 45 Stellar Classification, and he became president of that commission in 1973. He moved from La Plata to Europe in 1973 due to the political situation. There was political instability at that time in Argentina.

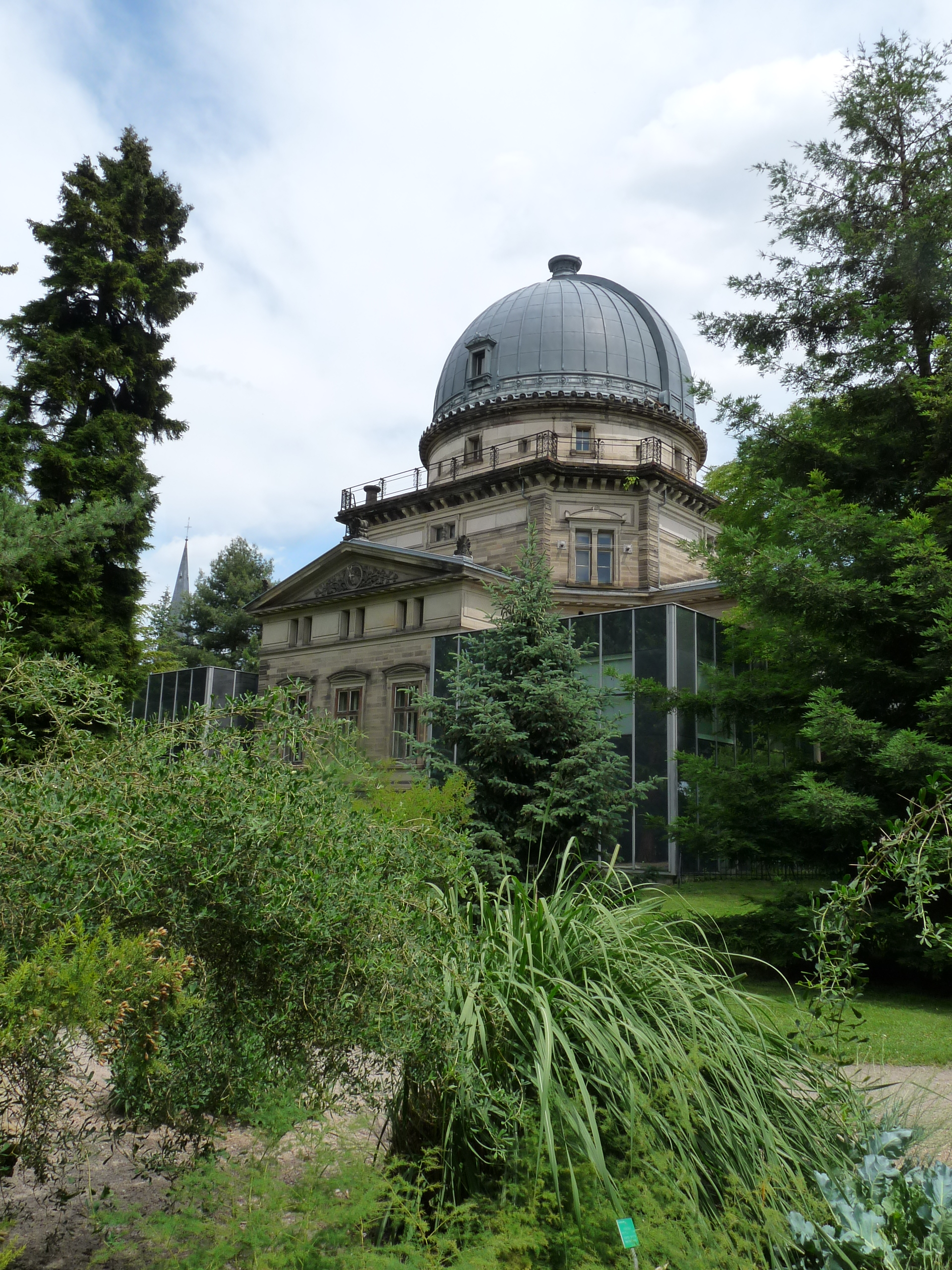
Both Carlos and Mercedes joined the staff at Strasbourg Observatory in 1974. It was part of Louis Pasteur University, also known as Strasbourg University.

In 1973, Jaschek was again at Geneva University as invited professor. He was then hired as an associate professor at Strasbourg University. He was at Strasbourg from 1974 to 1993, and he became a French citizen, as did his wife. He later became full professor, and supervised many students.

Jaschek encouraged the development of automated methods for stellar classification classifying stars. He also encouraged the development of astronomical data bases. He was "a force behind the development of the C.D.S," the Center de Données Stellaires (Center of Stellar Data). In 1968, Jaschek had described the problem of the increasing volume of astronomical data without adequate means of collecting and distributing it:

The main conclusion of this paper is that it is unavoidable that astronomers must change procedures for collecting data. The best procedure is probably the creation of one or several data centers which would store information continuously and distribute it at convenient intervals to the scientific community.

After a year at Geneva, Jaschek became Director of the Center de Données Stellaires(CDS) in Strasbourg. The CDS, begun in 1972, was an innovative but challenging project to create a central repository for astronomical data, an idea "even questioned by many French astronomers". In 1974, its first director, Jean Jung, changed careers. Carlos Jaschek officially began as Director in 1975, and Mercedes Jaschek strengthened the center's limited scientific staff. In 1977, Jaschek summarized the strengths and weakness of the world's astronomical data bases and noted that, with the exception of peculiar stars, considerable advances were being made. Jaschek noted:

We could all be very satisfied with this state of affairs, were it not for the disturbing fact that few of our colleagues use the information stocked at these centers. Astronomy in a certain sense is still a science with a nineteenth-century mentality so that novelties are only slowly accepted.

Jaschek directed the Center of Stellar Data (CDS) from 1975 to 1990, As Director, he was "instrumental in organizing world-wide access to astronomical data with special sensitivity to third-world countries. As the second director of CDS, Jaschek's 15-year term was said to have brought "spectacular progress for CDS" by increasing its international reputation as it was established as the leading astronomical data base. When it expanded its focus from stars to include other non-solar system astronomical objects, it changed its name from Center de Données Stellaires to the Centre de données astronomiques de Strasbourg (The Center of astronomical Data of Strasbourg).

As Director, Jaschek was concerned with improving astronomical naming conventions. In 1979 at an IAU meeting in Canada, over 100 astronomers from 15 Commissions met regarding the designation of objects, and before William P. Bidelman gave the report on their suggested reforms, Carlos Jaschek began to introduce the need for them by saying:

I think there is no need to emphasize the reason for a meeting on designations. I hope you are all convinced that the present way of baptizing new objects, or renaming old friends, is just a patchwork of responses to different needs at different times. I hope also that you are convinced that we should do something now, rather than leave the task to the future. And, finally, I hope you are optimistic that something can be done.

In 1986, he listed the 10 different factors for which a star may be named, noting that the variety was for historical reasons and "It is certainly not very rational to have 10 different practices for the same operation", before suggesting some guidelines.

Jaschek was also interested in the Set of Identifications, Measurements and Bibliography for Astronomical Data (SIMBAD). SIMBAD became operational in 1990. In addition to working to make the CDS the world's largest astronomical database, Jaschek helped with the creation of astronomical data centers in China, Japan, India, Argentina and the U.S.S.R.

The electromagnetic spectrum displaying visible, ultraviolet and infrared. The Jascheks worked in all three.

Jaschek worked in spectroscopy, photometry, and classification of stars and in statistical astronomy. Carlos and Mercedes Jaschek worked on stars, making spectral classification catalogs and atlases of spectral atlases in visible, ultraviolet (UV) and infrared (IR) wavelengths. They worked on the first classification schemes for the ultraviolet spectrum They collaborated with Yvette Andrillat on stars in the near-infrared, and Carlos Jaschek had a long-term collaboration with the Marcel Golay group in Switzerland to make comparisons between photometry and spectroscopy.

The Jascheks collaborated on Be, Ae, shell, Ap, and other peculiar stars. They produced a catalogue and bibliography of 2,000 Be stars for the period from 1950 to 1970 based on Mercedes Jaschek's survey of the Southern Celestial Hemisphere.

They were the first to introduce the gallium stars subgroup and to discover the ApSi4200 stars. They were the first to find the rare CNO stars which are O- or B- B-type stars where some of the elements C, N and O show spectral lines that are weaker or stronger than would be expected. They also identified the presence of rare-earth elements in stars of Mn and SrCrEu groups.

Carlos Jaschek helped create the Catalog of Bright Stars (fourth edition). Together the Jascheks wrote The Classification of Stars, which had 20 editions published, The Behavior of Chemical Elements in Stars (1995), and Spectroscopic Atlas for the Southern Sky Stars and other books. Their reference works were incorporated into the Strasbourg Centre of Stellar Data (CDS).

Jaschek also wrote Data in Astronomy in which he noted he became involved with data at La Plata in the early 1960s, when he was compiling a catalogue with a student for their own use and the student suggested publishing it. He authored or co-authored ~250 refereed publications and over 15 books and was noted for "precise observation and careful classification of peculiar stars" using the MK classification system. (Note: While the WorldCat site suggests 253 refereed items, the NASA Astrophysics Data System returns 511. Although some of these publications are reviews of his books written by others, they also include Carlos Jaschek's editorials.)

Jaschek was Invited Speaker at ~15 international meetings. He helped organize 14 scientific meetings, and frequently edited or co-edited the proceedings. In 1992, Jaschek founded the Société Européenne pour l' Astronomie dans la culture (European Society for Astronomy in Culture), a cultural astronomy organization which holds yearly conferences and is open to all nations. (Note: The SEAC established membership fees based on the member's country of origin to help equalize access for all countries.)

== Retirement ==
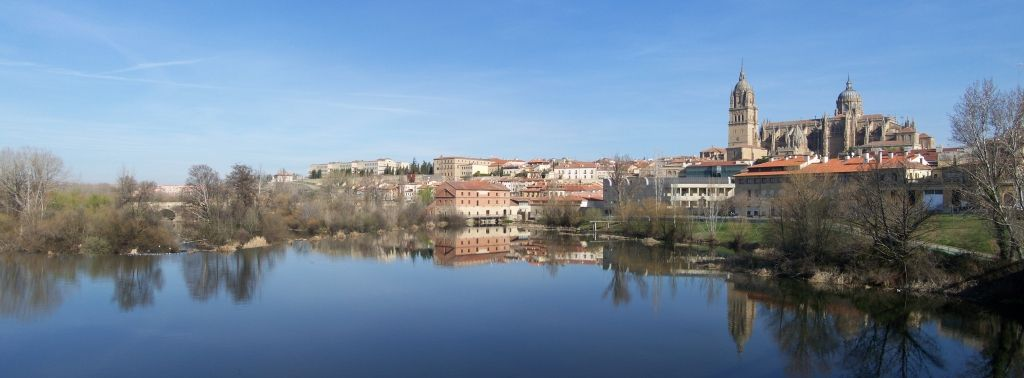
The Jascheks retired to Salamanca, Spain, in 1993.

In 1993, the Jascheks retired from Strasbourg Observatory. Due to poor health, they moved to Salamanca (Spain) to live with their daughter's family, and continued their scientific activities from their new location. The couple has been described as "inseparable in their life and in their work". Mercedes Jaschek died on November 21, 1995, and he was deeply impacted by the loss.

Jaschek continued making public presentations, and in 1998 he published a book on ethno-astronomy. He was remembered as someone who loved his family, astronomy and its impact on culture, teaching and history books, and was regarded as kind, optimistic, upright, and helpful. Carlos Jaschek died April 12, 1999, in Salamanca, Spain.

== Memberships and honors ==
- The Carlos Jaschek Award was created in his honor in 2006 by the Société Européenne pour l' Astronomie dans la culture (European Society for Astronomy in Culture).
- The minor planet (2964) Jaschek was named after him. It was discovered July 16, 1974, at the Carlos U. Cesco Observatory at El Leoncito.
- Received the 1955 John Simon Guggenheim Memorial Foundation fellowship. "Carlos Oton Rüdiger Jaschek". Astronomy and Astrophysics; Latin America & Caribbean competition.
- Member of the National Center for Scientific Research in France
- Member of the National Academy of Sciences of Argentina.
- Member of the Royal Argentine Astronomical Society
- Member of the Astronomische Gesellschaft, the German Astronomical Society.
- Member of the International Astronomical Union (IAU) Organizing Committee of Commission 33 Structure & Dynamics of the Galactic System from 1964 to 1967. Member of the Organizing Committee of Commission 45 Stellar Classification from 1967 to 1970, Jaschek became vice-president from 1970 to 1973, was president from 1973 to 1976, and was on the Organizing Committee from 1976 to 1979. He was on the Organizing Committee of Commission 29 Stellar Spectra from 1973 to 1985, and on the Organizing Committee of Commission 5 Documentation and Astronomical Data from 1982 to 1991.

== Select bibliography ==
(Note: These are Carlos Jaschek's five most-cited works on the NASA Astrophysics Data System as of July, 2017.)

Hoffleit, D.; Jaschek, C. (1982). The Bright Star Catalogue. Fourth revised edition. (Containing data compiled through 1979) Yale University Observatory, New Haven, CT, USA.

Cowley, Anne, Cowley, Charles, Jaschek, Mercedes & Jaschek, Carlos. "A study of the bright A stars. I. A catalogue of spectral classifications". Astronomical Journal, 74(3):375 – 406. April, 1969.

Jaschek, Carlos; Jaschek, Mercedes. (1987). The Classification of stars. Cambridge University Press. 1987. ISBN 978-0521267731.

Jaschek, M.; Jaschek, C.; Hubert-Delplace, A.-M.; Hubert, H. "A classification of Be stars". Astronomy and Astrophysics Supplement Series, 42:103–114. October, 1980.

Jaschek, Carlos; Conde, Horacio; de Sierra, Amelia C. "Catalogue of stellar spectra classified in the Morgan-Keenan system". Serie Astronomica, La Plata: Observatorio Astronomico de la Universidad de la Plata. 1964.

== See also ==
- Peculiar stars
- Stellar classification
