= HD 127304 =

Double star in the constellation Boötes

Observation data Epoch J2000 Equinox ICRS
- Constellation: Boötes
- Right ascension: 14^{h} 29^{m} 49.67058^{s}
- Declination: +31° 47′ 28.2787″
- Apparent magnitude (V): 6.05

Characteristics
- Evolutionary stage: main sequence
- Spectral type: A0Vs(Si)
- U−B color index: −0.06
- B−V color index: −0.03

Astrometry
Radial velocity (R_{v})	−9.3 km/s
Proper motion (μ)	RA: −20.815 mas/yr Dec.: +7.137 mas/yr
Parallax (π)	9.2332±0.0401 mas
Distance	353 ± 2 ly (108.3 ± 0.5 pc)
Absolute magnitude (M_{V})	+0.86

Details
Mass	2.5 M_{☉}
Radius	2.3 R_{☉}
Luminosity	52 L_{☉}
Surface gravity (log g)	3.99 cgs
Temperature	10,345 K
Metallicity [Fe/H]	0.23 dex
Rotational velocity (v sin i)	14 km/s
Age	263 Myr

Other designations
- BD+32°2482, HD 127304, HIP 70892, HR 5422, SAO 64178

Database references
SIMBAD	data

HD 127304 is a sixth magnitude A-type main sequence star in the northern constellation of Boötes, with a stellar classification of A0Vs(Si). The Si indicates abnormal strength of the silicon absorption lines in its spectrum, although it is considered doubtful that HD 127304 is actually a chemically peculiar star.

HD 127304 has a faint magnitude 10.62 companion at an angular separation of 25.6″ along a position angle of 256° (as of 2013), It is thought to be physically related, lying about 2,348 au from the primary. There is further 11th-magnitude star 107" away, but this is unrelated background object.
