= Antoni Przybylski =

Polish-Australian astronomer

Antoni 'Bill' Przybylski
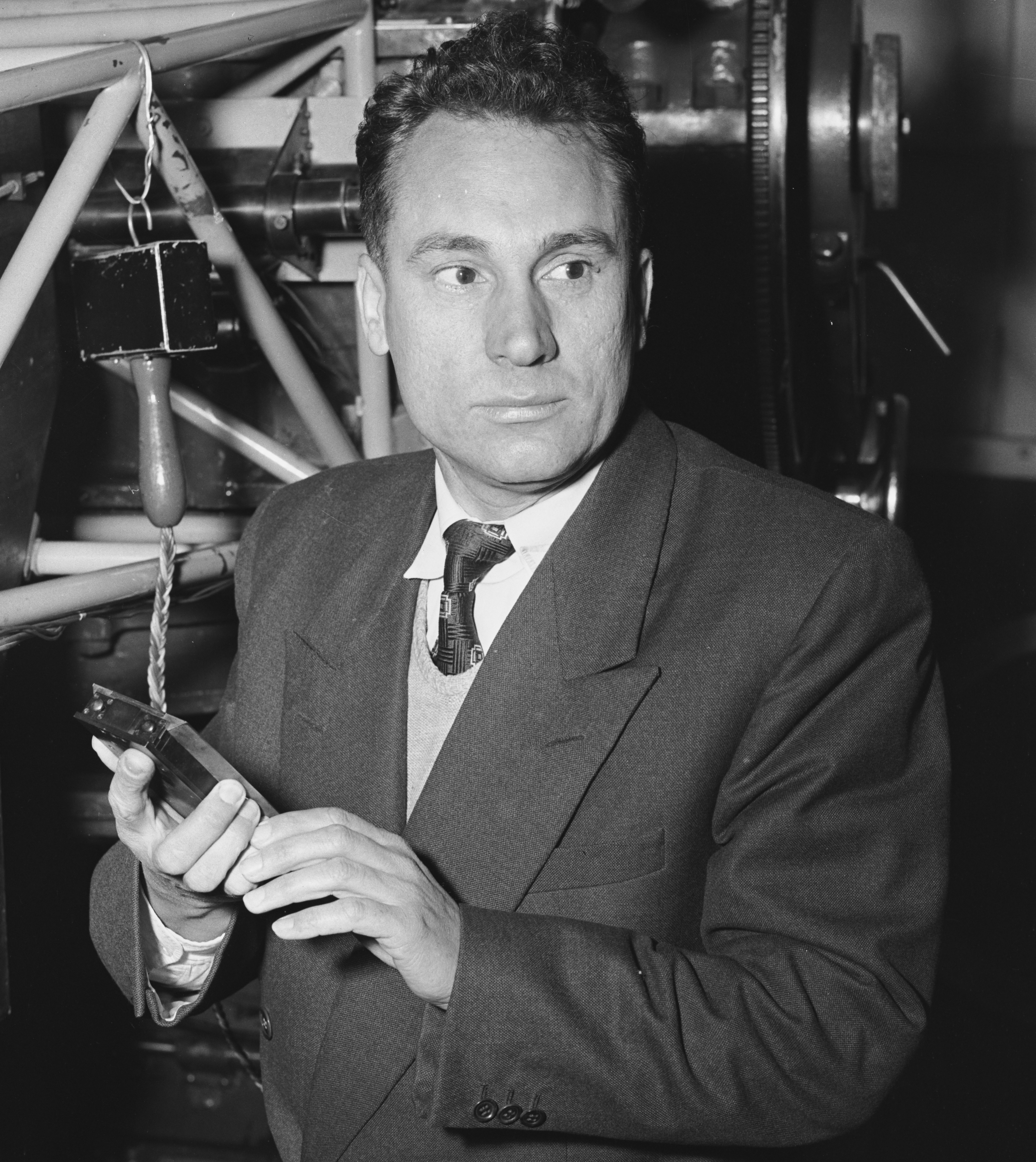
- Antoni Przybylski, Mt. Stromlo observatory, Australia, May 1954
- Born: 29 December 1913; Rogoźno, Poland
- Died: 21 September 1985 (aged 72); Queanbeyan, New South Wales, Australia
- Citizenship: Polish, Australian
- Education: University of Poznan (BSc, MPhil); ETH Zurich (Doctorate of Technical Science, 1949); Australian National University (PhD, 1954); Australian National University (BSc Natural Sciences, 1984)
- Known for: Przybylski's Star
- Scientific career
- Fields: Chemistry, Astronomy, Natural Science
- Institutions: University of Poznan (circ. 1933 - ?); ETH Zurich (circ. 1941 - 1949); Mount Stromlo Observatory (circ. 1950 - circ. 1978)
- Thesis: The maximum effect of convection in stellar atmospheres on the observed properties of stellar spectra (1953)

Antoni Przybylski (1913 – 21 September 1985), (Polish pronunciation [anˈtɔɲi pʂɨˈbɨlskʲi]), sometimes referred to as "Bill", was a Polish-Australian astronomer best known for discovering the star that was named for him.

== Early life ==
In the 1930s, Przybylski attended the University of Poznań and worked as a research assistant at their observatory, where he studied comets.

== World War II ==
At the outbreak of the Second World War, he joined the Polish Army and served as an artillery officer during the defense of Warsaw, after which he was taken prisoner and interned in Mecklenburg. In 1941, he escaped, and made his way across Germany, mostly at night, until he finally arrived in Switzerland, where he spent the rest of the war as a student and instructor at ETH Zurich. At ETH, he eventually earned a Doctorate in Technical Science, writing a thesis titled "Determination of Oxygen in Copper."

== Australia ==
In 1950, Przybylski emigrated to Australia aboard the SS Goya. There, he spent five months as a manual laborer for the Postmaster General's Department before coming to the attention of Richard Woolley, who recruited him to work at Mount Stromlo Observatory (part of the then-nascent Australian National University). Woolley subsequently awarded him a scholarship, and then became his thesis supervisor; in 1954, Przybylski received the first doctorate bestowed by ANU, for his thesis on the theory of stellar atmospheres.

In 1957, Woolley was replaced as director of Mount Stromlo by Bart Bok, who mandated that the observatory's theoreticians also participate in direct observation; this led directly to Przybylski's discovery that HD101065 is a peculiar star. Przybylski also was the first to attempt a fine analysis of a high dispersion spectrum of a star in the Magellanic Clouds.

== Later life ==
After retiring from Mount Stromlo, Przybylski lived at ANU's John XXIII college and studied botany, zoology, and geology gaining a Bachelor of Science degree in Natural Sciences in 1984 at the age of 71, a year before his death.
