= HD 177765 =

Star in the constellation Sagittarius

- Location of HD 177765 (circled)

Observation data Epoch J2000.0 Equinox J2000.0
- Constellation: Sagittarius
- Right ascension: 19^{h} 07^{m} 09.77940^{s}
- Declination: −26° 19′ 54.5064″
- Apparent magnitude (V): 9.15

Characteristics
- Evolutionary stage: main sequence
- Spectral type: A5 SrEuCr
- B−V color index: 0.45
- J−H color index: 0.071
- J−K color index: 0.055
- Variable type: roAp

Astrometry
Proper motion (μ)	RA: −2.063 mas/yr Dec.: −4.425 mas/yr
Parallax (π)	2.5411±0.0186 mas
Distance	1,284 ± 9 ly (394 ± 3 pc)
Absolute magnitude (M_{V})	1.55, 1.166

Details
Mass	1.81, 2.2 M_{☉}
Radius	2.57 R_{☉}
Luminosity	18.9, 26.9, ~32 L_{☉}
Surface gravity (log g)	3.79 cgs
Temperature	7420, 7002, 8000 K
Rotational velocity (v sin i)	2.50 km/s
Age	955 Myr

Other designations
- CD−26°13816, CPD−26°6650, HD 177765, SAO 187692, PPM 269324, EPIC 214503319, TIC 465996299, TYC 6882-1808-1, GSC 06882-01808, 2MASS J19070978-2619543, Gaia DR2 6763969142066777344, Renson 49550

Database references
SIMBAD	data

HD 177765 is a white-hued star in the southern constellation of Sagittarius. With an apparent magnitude of 9.15, it is too faint to be seen by the naked eye from Earth, but is dimly visible using binoculars. It is located at a distance of 1,284 light-years (394 parsecs) according to Gaia DR3 parallax measurements.

== Description ==
The star is classified as a rapidly oscillating Ap star (roAp star). It shows super-solar abundances of chromium and strontium as well as many rare-earth elements such as europium and cerium, but is depleted of carbon and nickel. In 2012, the star was found to pulsate with a low radial velocity amplitude of 7–150 m/s and a period of 23.6 minutes, the latter being the longest out of any known roAp star at the time. Two additional pulsation frequencies were detected in 2016.

The precise stellar parameters vary from publication to publication, but the star is considered to be part of a group of evolved roAp stars with long pulsation periods, alongside β CrB A and HD 116114. The existence of this group implies a systematic shift of rare-earth emission line anomalies as roAp stars age.
