= Przybylski's Star =

Star in the constellation Centaurus

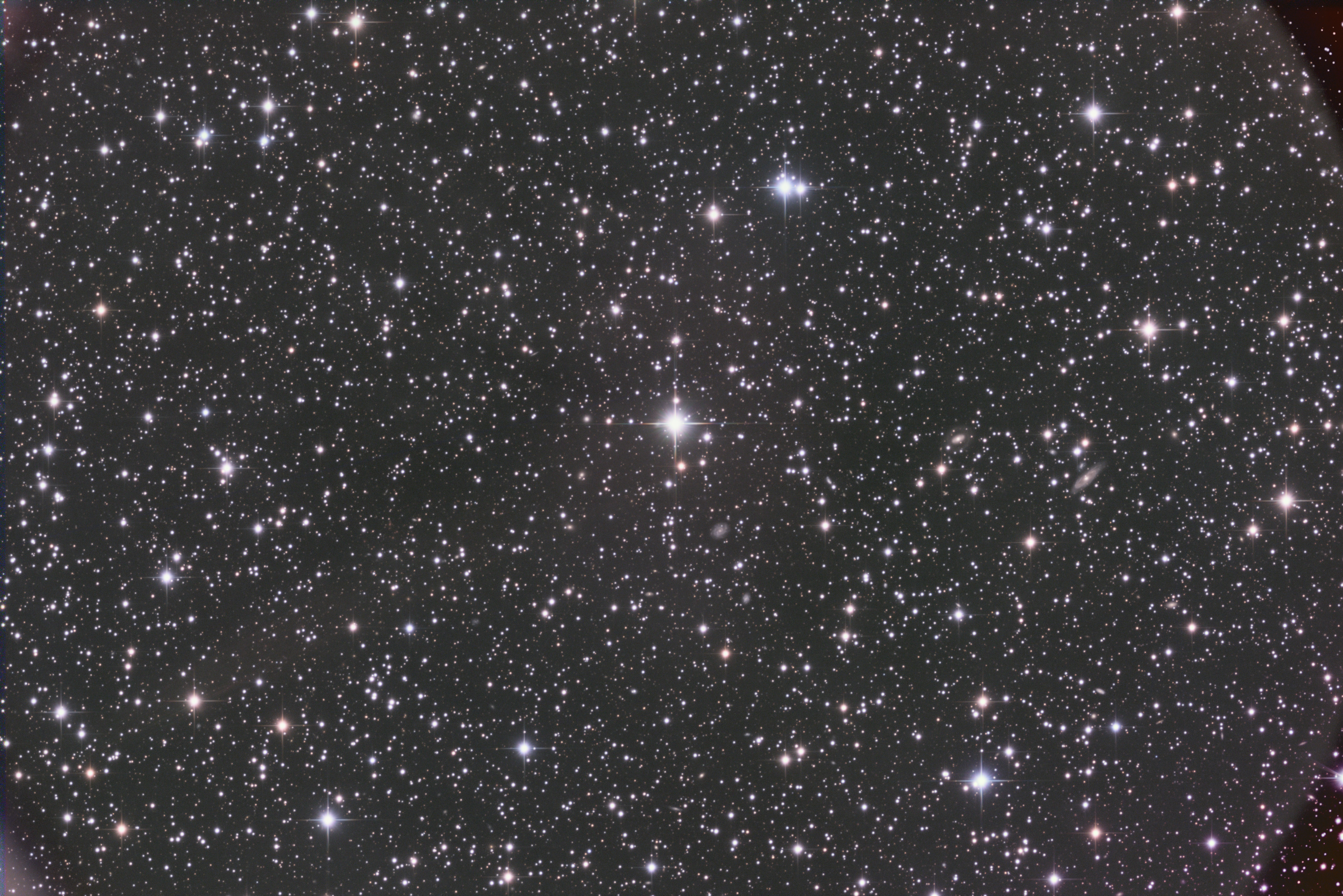
- Star field containing Przybylski's Star (bright star at center, north is down)

Observation data Epoch J2000 Equinox ICRS
- Constellation: Centaurus
- Right ascension: 11^{h} 37^{m} 37.04096^{s}
- Declination: −46° 42′ 34.8779″
- Apparent magnitude (V): 7.996–8.020

Characteristics
- Evolutionary stage: main sequence
- Spectral type: F0, F5, or G0 (F3 Ho)
- U−B color index: +0.20
- B−V color index: +0.76
- Variable type: roAp

Astrometry
Radial velocity (R_{v})	+12.4±3 km/s
Proper motion (μ)	RA: −46.783 mas/yr Dec.: +34.193 mas/yr
Parallax (π)	9.1496±0.0213 mas
Distance	356.5 ± 0.8 ly (109.3 ± 0.3 pc)
Absolute magnitude (M_{V})	+2.8

Details
Mass	1.4 M_{☉}
Radius	1.90 R_{☉}
Luminosity	5.55 L_{☉}
Surface gravity (log g)	3.97 cgs
Temperature	6,131 K
Metallicity [Fe/H]	−2.40 dex
Rotation	188 years
Rotational velocity (v sin i)	3.50 km/s
Age	1.5±0.1 Gyr

Other designations
- V816 Cen, CD−46°7232, HD 101065, HIP 56709, SAO 222918

Database references
SIMBAD	data

Przybylski's Star (pronounced [pʂɨˈbɨlskʲi]), or HD 101065, is a rapidly oscillating Ap star at roughly 356 light-years (109 parsecs) from the Sun in the southern constellation of Centaurus. It is an unusual chemically peculiar star with a unique spectrum showing over-abundances of most rare-earth elements, for example, but under-abundances of more common elements such as iron.

== Observation history ==
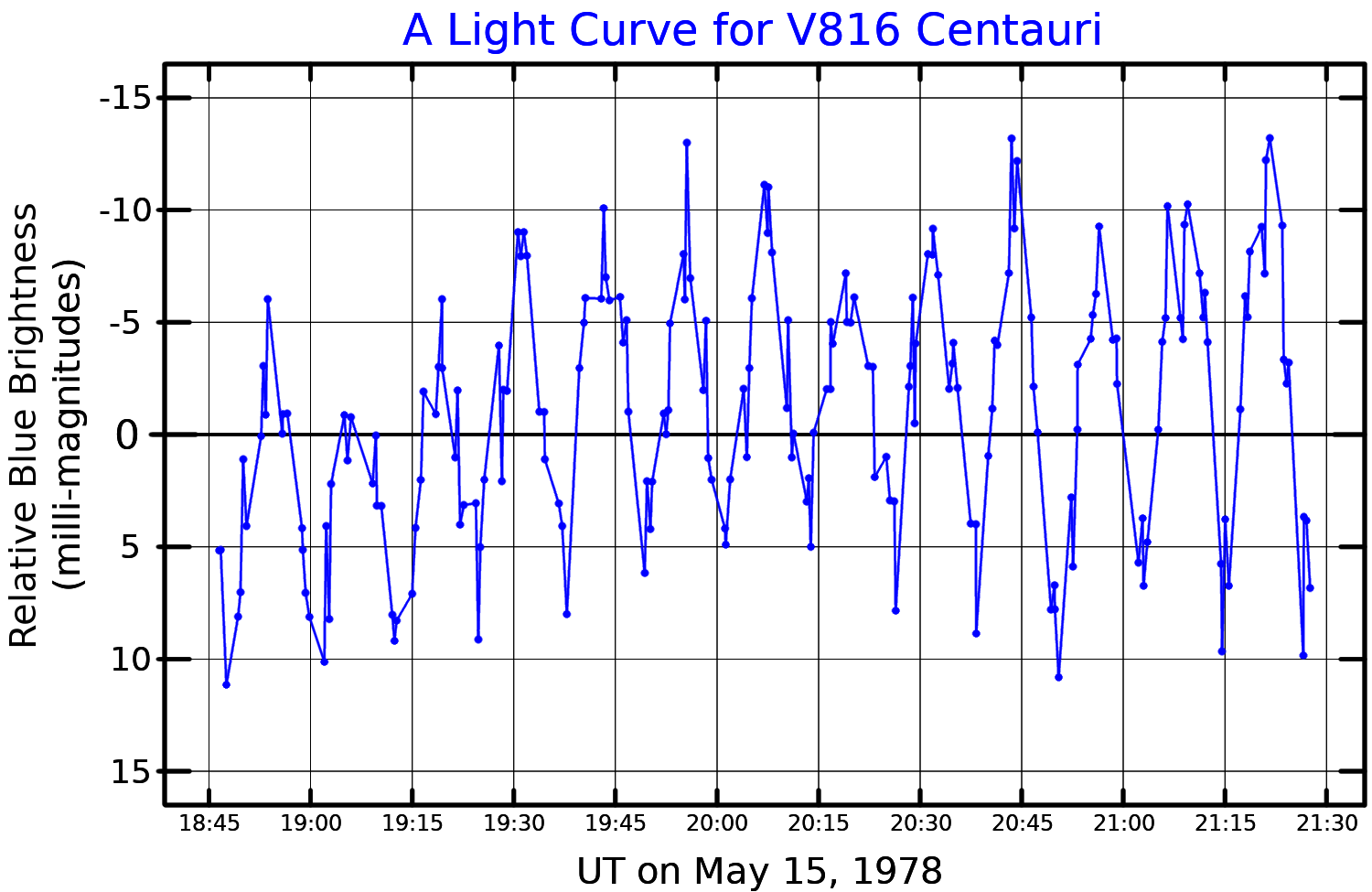
A blue band light curve for V816 Centauri, adapted from Kurtz and Wegner (1979)

This star was first recorded by Benjamin Apthorp Gould on April 29, 1873, and catalogued as the 10th star of Zone 257 with right ascension of 11^{h} 31^{m} 32.89^{s} and declination of −46° 01′ 08″ (at epoch 1875.0) and apparent magnitude of 8.5.

In 1961, the Polish-Australian astronomer Antoni Przybylski discovered that this star had a peculiar spectrum that would not fit into the standard framework for stellar classification. Przybylski's observations indicated unusually low amounts of iron and nickel in the star's spectrum, but higher amounts of unusual elements such as strontium, holmium, niobium, scandium, yttrium, caesium, neodymium, praseodymium, thorium, ytterbium, and uranium. In fact, at first Przybylski doubted that iron was present in the spectrum at all. Modern work shows that the iron group elements are somewhat below normal in abundance, but it is clear that the lanthanides, among others, are highly over-abundant.

There have been many attempts to assign a conventional spectral class to this star. The Henry Draper Catalogue gives a class of B5. More detailed analysis when the unusual nature of the star was discovered estimated a class of F8 or G0. Later studies gave classes of F0 or F5 to G0. It is considered likely to be a main sequence star with a temperature somewhat hotter than the Sun, but with its spectral lines strongly blanketed by the extreme abundances of certain metals. A catalogue of chemically peculiar stars gives the type F3 Ho, indicating an Ap star with an approximate spectral class of F3 and strong holmium lines. Compared to neighboring stars, HD 101065 has a high peculiar velocity of 23.8±1.9 km/s.

== Properties ==
With a mass of about 1.5 M_{☉} and an age of around 1.5 billion years, HD 101065 is calculated to be right at the end of its main sequence life. It shines with a bolometric luminosity of about 5.6 L_{☉} at an effective temperature of 6,131 K. It has a very slow projected rotational velocity for a hot main sequence star of just 3.5 km/s. Observations of its magnetic field suggest a possible rotation period of about 188 years, although this is considered a minimum possible value. A metallicity index ([Fe/H]) of −2.40 has been published (less than 1% that of the Sun), but this single value (for iron) does not adequately represent the chemical makeup shown in the star's unique spectrum. Levels of some other metals as derived from the spectrum are thousands of times higher than in the Sun. Also, because the chemical peculiarities of Ap stars in general are largely due to stratification of elements allowed by very slow rotation, the published metallicity presumably is not representative of the proportion of heavy elements in the whole star.

HD 101065 is the prototype star of the rapidly oscillating Ap star (roAp) variable star class. In 1978, it was discovered to pulsate photometrically with a period of 12.15 min.

A potential companion had also been detected, a 14th-magnitude star (in infrared) 8 arc seconds away, indicating at the primary's distance a minimum separation of just 1,000 AU (0.02 light-years); however, Gaia Data Release 2 suggests that the pair is only optical and the distance to this second star is 890±90 light-years, more than twice the distance to Przybylski's Star.

=== Chemically peculiar atmosphere ===
Przybylski's stellar atmosphere is "highly magnetic, stratified and chemically peculiar." Two different types of unusual spectroscopic observation have been reported.

Many different short-lived actinide elements, namely, actinium, protactinium, neptunium, plutonium, americium, curium, berkelium, californium, and einsteinium have been reported in the absorption spectrum. Radioactive elements have also been reported to include technetium and promethium. While the longest-lived known isotopes of technetium have half-lives in the millions of years, the longest-lived known promethium isotope has a half-life of only 17.7 years. The presence of these elements in the stellar atmosphere would imply some process constantly replenishing it. Models to explain such replenishment hypothesize continuous bombardment of the stellar atmosphere by magnetically accelerated particles or from a companion neutron star. However, more recent spectral analysis has not confirmed the existence of technetium or of promethium.

The other unusual spectroscopic observation is the abundance of elements with atomic numbers 35 < Z < 82 being a thousand times more than observed in the Solar System. Przybylski's original observations found a very high abundance of rare earth elements and holmium was confirmed in the atmosphere of this star even before it was found in the spectrum of the Sun. While unusual diffusion processes (the normal cause of chemical peculiarity) may account for these observations, nuclear reactions caused by atmospheric particle bombardment could also explain the anomaly.

Przybylski's star has occasionally attracted attention as a SETI candidate insofar as it aligns with speculation that a technological species may salt the photosphere of its star with unusual elements, either to signal its presence to other civilizations or to dispose of nuclear waste.

== See also ==
- Tabby's Star – Star noted for unusual dimming events
