= Alpha2 Canum Venaticorum variable =

Variable star type

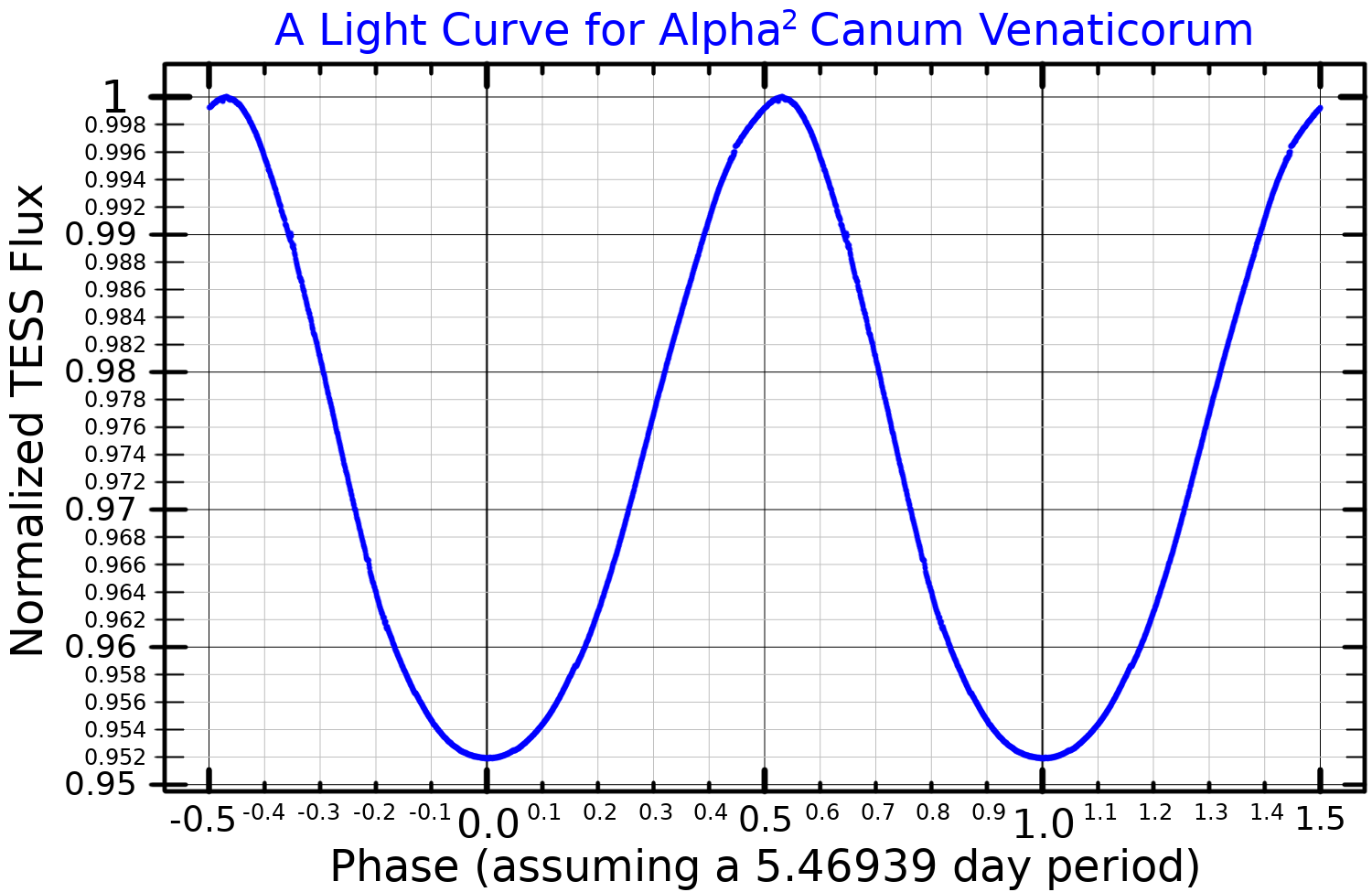
A light curve for α^{2} Canum Venaticorum, plotted from TESS data

Alpha^{2} Canum Venaticorum variable (or α^{2} CVn variable) is a type of magnetic variable star. These are chemically peculiar stars of the CP2 type that are photometrically variable. That is, they are upper main sequence stars of spectral class B8p to A7p, with strong magnetic fields and strong silicon, strontium, or chromium spectral lines. Their brightness typically varies by 0.01 to 0.1 magnitudes over the course of 0.5 to 160 days.

The first CP2 variable to be discovered was α^{2} Canum Venaticorum, a star in the binary system of Cor Caroli, which lies in the northern constellation of Canes Venatici. Its brightness fluctuates by 0.14 magnitudes with a period of 5.47 days. This is now the prototype of the α^{2} CVn class of variables.

In addition to their brightness, the intensities and profiles of the spectral lines of α^{2} CVn variables vary, as do their magnetic fields. The periods of these variations are all equal and are believed to equal the period of rotation of the star. It is thought that they are caused by an inhomogeneous distribution of chemical elements in the atmospheres of these stars. These result in spots and enhanced element abundances, which produce localized variations in surface flux. The oblique rotator model explains how these variations are carried across the field of view, resulting in the stellar variability. Several factors are thought responsible for the spots, including a weak stellar wind, the properties of the magnetic field, a weak convection zone, and a slow rotation rate.

== Naked eye examples ==
This list shows selected variables of this class that are visible to the naked eye. That is, their typical brightness is magnitude 6.5 or brighter.

List of Alpha^{2} Canum Venaticorum Variables
Designation (name)	Constellation	Discovery	Apparent magnitude (Maximum)	Apparent magnitude (Minimum)	Range of magnitude	Spectral type	Comment
(α^{2} Canum Venaticorum); Cor Caroli	Canes Venatici		2.84	2.98	0.14	A0Vp(Si-Cr-Eu)	Prototype; binary
(ε UMa) Alioth	Ursa Major		1.76		0.02	A1III-IVp kB9(Cr-Eu)	Brightest member; binary
α Dor	Dorado		3.26	3.30	0.04	B9IIIp(Si)	One of the hottest; binary
α Psc (Alrescha)	Pisces		3.82	3.83	0.01	A2IVp(Sr)	Binary
β Hydrae A	Hydra	1834	4.67	4.71	0.04	B8.5IIIp(Si)	Hottest member; binary
HD 187474	Sagittarius		5.28	5.34	0.06	A0 EuCrSr	Long 6.4 year period; binary
