= Magnetic chemically peculiar star =

Chemically peculiar stars of spectral types A and B

Magnetic chemically peculiar stars, classified as Ap or Bp stars, are chemically peculiar stars (hence the "p") of spectral types A or B which show overabundances of some metals, such as strontium, chromium, or europium. In addition, larger overabundances are often seen in praseodymium and neodymium. These stars have a much slower rotation than normal for A- and B-type stars, although some exhibit equatorial rotation velocities up to about 100 kilometers per second.

== Magnetic fields ==
Ap and Bp stars have stronger magnetic fields than classical A- or B-type stars; in the case of HD 215441, reaching 33.5 kG (3.35 T). Typically the magnetic field of these stars lies in the range of a few kG to tens of kG. In most cases a field which is modelled as a simple dipole is a good approximation and provides an explanation as to why there is an apparent periodic variation in the magnetic field, as if such a field is not aligned with the rotation axis—the field strength will change as the star rotates. In support of this theory it has been noted that the variations in magnetic field are inversely correlated with the rotation velocity. This model of a dipolar field, in which the magnetic axis is offset to the rotation axis, is known as the oblique rotator model.

The origin of such high magnetic fields in Ap stars is problematic and two theories have been proposed in order to explain them. The first is the fossil field hypothesis, in which the field is a relic of the initial field in the interstellar medium (ISM). There is sufficient magnetic field in the ISM to create such high magnetic fields—indeed, so much so that the theory of ambipolar diffusion has to be invoked to reduce the field in normal stars. This theory does require the field to remain stable over a long period of time, and it is unclear whether such an obliquely rotating field could do so. Another problem with this theory is to explain why only a small proportion of A-type stars exhibit these high field strengths. The other generation theory is dynamo action within rotating cores of Ap stars; however, the oblique nature of the field cannot be produced, as yet, by this model, as invariably one ends up with a field either aligned with the rotation axis, or at 90° to it. It is also unclear whether it is possible to generate such large dipole fields using this explanation, due to the slow rotation of the star. While this could be explained by invoking a fast rotating core with a high rotation gradient to the surface, it is unlikely that an ordered axisymmetric field would result.

== Abundance spots ==
The spatial locations of the chemical overabundances have been shown to be connected with the geometry of the magnetic field. Some of these stars have shown radial velocity variations arising from pulsations of a few minutes. For studying these stars high-resolution spectroscopy is used, together with Doppler imaging which uses the rotation to deduce a map of the stellar surface. These patches of overabundances are often referred to as abundance spots.

== Rapidly oscillating Ap stars ==
A subset of this class of stars, called rapidly oscillating Ap (roAp) stars, exhibit short-timescale, millimagnitude photometric variations and variations in radial velocities of spectral lines. These were first observed in the highly peculiar Ap star HD 101065 (Przybylski's star). These stars lie at the bottom of the Delta Scuti instability strip, on the main sequence. There are currently 35 known roAp stars. The pulsation periods of these oscillators lie between 5 and 21 minutes. The stars pulsate in high overtone, non-radial, pressure modes.

== See also ==
- Peculiar star
- Stellar classification
- Doppler imaging
- Pollux, the closest red giant to the Sun which may have been an Ap star when on the main sequence
