= Chemically peculiar star =

Stars with distinctly unusual metal abundances

In astrophysics, chemically peculiar stars (CP stars) are stars with distinct patterns of metal and helium abundances, at least in their surface layers.

== Classification ==
Chemically peculiar stars are common among hot main-sequence (hydrogen-burning) stars. These hot peculiar stars have been divided into four main classes on the basis of their spectra, although two classification systems are sometimes used:

- non-magnetic metallic-lined (Am, CP1)
- magnetic (Ap, CP2)
- non-magnetic mercury-manganese (HgMn, CP3)
- helium-weak (He-weak, CP4).

The class names provide a good idea of the peculiarities that set them apart from other stars on or near the main sequence.

The Am stars (CP1 stars) show weak lines of singly ionized Ca and/or Sc, but show enhanced abundances of heavy metals. They also tend to be slow rotators and have an effective temperature between 7000 and 10000 K.

The Ap stars (CP2 stars) are characterized by strong magnetic fields, enhanced abundances of elements such as Si, Cr, Sr and Eu, and are also generally slow rotators. The effective temperature of these stars is stated to be between 8000 and 15000 K, but the issue of calculating effective temperatures in such peculiar stars is complicated by atmospheric structure.

The HgMn stars (CP3 stars) are also classically placed within the Ap category, but they do not show the strong magnetic fields associated with classical Ap stars. As the name implies, these stars show increased abundances of singly ionized mercury and manganese. These stars are also very slow rotators, even by the standards of CP stars. The effective temperature range for these stars is quoted at between 10000 and 15000 K.

The He-weak stars (CP4 stars) show weaker He lines than would be expected classically from their observed Johnson UBV colours. A rare class of He-weak stars are, paradoxically, the helium-rich or helium-strong stars, with temperatures of 18000–23000 K.

== Cause of the peculiarities ==
It is generally thought that the peculiar surface compositions observed in these hot main-sequence stars have been caused by processes that happened after the star formed, such as diffusion or magnetic effects in the outer layers of the stars. These processes cause some elements, particularly He, N and O, to "settle" out in the atmosphere into the layers below, while other elements such as Mn, Sr, Y and Zr are "levitated" out of the interior to the surface, resulting in the observed spectral peculiarities. It is assumed that the centers of the stars, and the bulk compositions of the entire star, have more normal chemical abundance mixtures which reflect the compositions of the gas clouds from which they formed. In order for such diffusion and levitation to occur and the resulting layers to remain intact, the atmosphere of such a star must be stable enough to convection that convective mixing does not occur. The proposed mechanism causing this stability is the unusually large magnetic field that is generally observed in stars of this type.

Approximately 5–10% of hot main sequence stars show chemical peculiarities. Of these, the vast majority are Ap (or Bp) stars with strong magnetic fields. Non-magnetic, or only weakly magnetic, chemically peculiar stars mostly fall into the Am or HgMn categories. A much smaller percentage show stronger peculiarities, such as the dramatic under-abundance of iron peak elements in λ Boötis stars.

== sn stars ==
Another group of stars sometimes considered to be chemically peculiar are the 'sn' stars. These hot stars, usually of spectral classes B2 to B9, show Balmer lines with sharp (s) cores, sharp metallic absorption lines, and contrasting broad (nebulous, n) neutral helium absorption lines. These may be combined with the other chemical peculiarities more commonly seen in B-type stars.

It was originally proposed that the unusual helium lines were created in a weak shell of material around the star, but are now thought to be caused by the Stark effect.

== Other stars ==
There are also classes of chemically peculiar cool stars (that is, stars with spectral type G or later), but these stars are typically not main-sequence stars. These are usually identified by the name of their class or some further specific label. The phrase chemically peculiar star without further specification usually means a member of one of the hot main sequence types described above. Many of the cooler chemically peculiar stars are the result of the mixing of nuclear fusion products from the interior of the star to its surface; these include most of the carbon stars and S-type stars. Others are the result of mass transfer in a binary star system; examples of these include the barium stars, CN stars, and some S stars.

== Substellar companions ==
There are few reports of transiting exoplanets whose host stars are chemically peculiar stars. The young variable star HR 8799, which hosts four directly imaged massive planets, belongs to the group of λ Boötis stars. Similarly, the binary star HIP 79098, whose primary is a mercury-manganese star, was found via direct imaging to have either a circumbinary brown dwarf or a circumbinary gas giant.

== See also ==
- List of stars that have unusual dimming periods
- Przybylski's Star
