= List of stars in Andromeda =

This is the list of notable stars in the constellation Andromeda, sorted by decreasing brightness.

Name	B	F	Var	HD	HIP	RA	Dec	vis. mag.	abs. mag.	Dist. (ly)	Sp. class	Notes
Alpheratz	α, (δ) (Note: Also designated Delta Pegasi (δ Peg) by Bayer)	21		358	677	00^{h} 08^{m} 23.17^{s}	+29° 05′ 27.0″	2.07	−0.30	97	B9p	Alpheratz, Sirrah; α^{2} CVn variable, ΔV = 0.04^{m}, P = 0.966222 d; spectroscopic binary, also δ Peg
Mirach	β	43		6860	5447	01^{h} 09^{m} 43.80^{s}	+35° 37′ 15.0″	2.07	−1.86	199	M0IIIvar	Mirach; variable, has a planet or brown dwarf (b)
γ^{1} And	γ^{1}	57		12533	9640	02^{h} 03^{m} 53.92^{s}	+42° 19′ 47.5″	2.10	−3.08	355	K3IIb	Almach; quadruple star system
δ And	δ	31		3627	3092	00^{h} 39^{m} 19.60^{s}	+30° 51′ 40.4″	3.27	0.81	101	K3III...	Kuda, spectroscopic binary; suspected variable
51 And	(υ) (Note: Bayer designated it as υ Per.) (Note: Bode lettered it as 2.υ, in his "Verzeichniss".)	51		9927	7607	01^{h} 37^{m} 59.50^{s}	+48° 37′ 42.6″	3.59	−0.04	174	K3III	Nembus; multiple star
ο And	ο	1		217675	113726	23^{h} 01^{m} 55.25^{s}	+42° 19′ 33.5″	3.62	−3.01	692	B6pv SB	Alfarasalkamil quadruple star system; γ Cas variable, V_{max} = 3.55^{m}, V_{min} = 3.78^{m}
λ And	λ	16		222107	116584	23^{h} 37^{m} 33.71^{s}	+46° 27′ 33.0″	3.81	1.75	84	G8III-IV	Udkadua, RS CVn variable, V_{max} = 3.65^{m}, V_{min} = 4.05^{m}, P = 53.95 d
μ And	μ	37		5448	4436	00^{h} 56^{m} 45.10^{s}	+38° 29′ 57.3″	3.86	0.75	136	A5V	multiple star
ζ And	ζ	34		4502	3693	00^{h} 47^{m} 20.39^{s}	+24° 16′ 02.6″	4.08	0.35	181	K1II	Shimu, β Lyr/RS CVn variable, V_{max} = 3.92^{m}, V_{min} = 4.14^{m}, P = 17.7696 d
υ And	υ (Note: Flamsteed lettered it as υ.) (Note: Bode lettered it as 1.υ in his "Verzeichniss".)	50		9826	7513	01^{h} 36^{m} 47.98^{s}	+41° 24′ 23.0″	4.10	3.45	44	F8V	Titawin, has four planets (b, c, d & e)
κ And	κ	19		222439	116805	23^{h} 40^{m} 24.44^{s}	+44° 20′ 02.3″	4.15	0.57	170	B9IVn	Kaffalmusalsala, triple star, has a planet (b)
φ And	φ	42		6811	5434	01^{h} 09^{m} 30.12^{s}	+47° 14′ 30.6″	4.26	−2.51	736	B7III	Junnanmen, emission-line star
ι And	ι	17		222173	116631	23^{h} 38^{m} 08.18^{s}	+43° 16′ 05.1″	4.29	−1.65	502	B8V	Rasalnaqa, Keff al Salsalat, Manus Catenata
π And	π	29		3369	2912	00^{h} 36^{m} 52.84^{s}	+33° 43′ 09.7″	4.34	−2.18	656	B5V	spectroscopic binary; suspected variable
ε And	ε	30		3546	3031	00^{h} 38^{m} 33.50^{s}	+29° 18′ 44.5″	4.34	0.77	169	G5III...	Anunitu
η And	η	38		5516	4463	00^{h} 57^{m} 12.43^{s}	+23° 25′ 03.9″	4.40	0.04	243	G8III-IV	Kui, spectroscopic binary
σ And	σ	25		1404	1473	00^{h} 18^{m} 19.71^{s}	+36° 47′ 07.2″	4.51	1.33	141	A2V	suspected variable
ν And	ν	35		4727	3881	00^{h} 49^{m} 48.83^{s}	+41° 04′ 44.2″	4.53	−2.06	679	B5V SB	spectroscopic binary
7 And		7		219080	114570	23^{h} 12^{m} 32.92^{s}	+49° 24′ 21.5″	4.53	2.58	80	F0V	Honores
θ And	θ	24		1280	1366	00^{h} 17^{m} 05.54^{s}	+38° 40′ 54.0″	4.61	0.16	253	A2V	suspected variable
3 And		3		218031	113919	23^{h} 04^{m} 10.83^{s}	+50° 03′ 06.1″	4.64	0.94	179	K0III	
65 And		65		14872	11313	02^{h} 25^{m} 37.40^{s}	+50° 16′ 43.2″	4.73	−0.39	345	K4III	triple star
58 And		58		13041	9977	02^{h} 08^{m} 29.15^{s}	+37° 51′ 33.1″	4.78	0.86	198	A5IV-V	
8 And		8		219734	115022	23^{h} 17^{m} 44.62^{s}	+49° 00′ 55.0″	4.82	−1.69	655	M2III	suspected variable
ω And	ω (Note: Flamsteed unlettered it in his catalogue and atlas.)	48		8799	6813	01^{h} 27^{m} 39.09^{s}	+45° 24′ 25.0″	4.83	2.57	92	F5IV	
γ^{2} And	γ^{2}	57		12534		02^{h} 03^{m} 54.70^{s}	+42° 19′ 51.0″	4.84	-0.3	350	B8V	component of the γ And system; triple star system
60 And	b	60		13520	10340	02^{h} 13^{m} 13.34^{s}	+44° 13′ 54.1″	4.84	−1.32	556	K4III	suspected variable
ξ And	ξ	46		8207	6411	01^{h} 22^{m} 20.39^{s}	+45° 31′ 43.5″	4.87	0.98	195	K0III-IV	Adhil
τ And	τ	53		10205	7818	01^{h} 40^{m} 34.80^{s}	+40° 34′ 37.6″	4.96	−1.64	681	B8III	suspected variable
41 H. And	υ (Note: Bayer originally lettered it as υ.)			10307	7918	01^{h} 41^{m} 46.52^{s}	+42° 36′ 49.7″	4.96	4.45	41	G2V	spectroscopic binary
ψ And	ψ	20		223047	117221	23^{h} 46^{m} 02.04^{s}	+46° 25′ 13.0″	4.97	−3.05	1309	G5Ib	multiple star
22 And		22		571	841	00^{h} 10^{m} 19.24^{s}	+46° 04′ 20.2″	5.01	−2.44	1006	F2II	Tianjiu
χ And	χ (Note: Flamsteed lettered it as λ.)	52		10072	7719	01^{h} 39^{m} 21.02^{s}	+44° 23′ 10.1″	5.01	0.66	242	G8III...	
41 And	(d) (Note: Flamsteed lettered it as d.)	41		6658	5317	01^{h} 08^{m} 00.72^{s}	+43° 56′ 32.1″	5.04	1.14	196	A3m	
2 And		2		217782	113788	23^{h} 02^{m} 36.34^{s}	+42° 45′ 28.1″	5.09	−0.06	349	A3Vn	multiple star
V428 And			V428	3346	2900	00^{h} 36^{m} 46.47^{s}	+44° 29′ 18.6″	5.14	−1.38	656	K5III	semiregular variable, ΔV = 0.06^{m}, P = 11.5 d; has a possible planetary system
ρ And	ρ	27		1671	1686	00^{h} 21^{m} 07.23^{s}	+37° 58′ 07.3″	5.16	1.71	160	F5III	
HD 2421				2421	2225	00^{h} 28^{m} 13.59^{s}	+44° 23′ 40.2″	5.18	0.63	265	A2Vs	spectroscopic binary
64 And		64		14770	11220	02^{h} 24^{m} 24.89^{s}	+50° 00′ 23.9″	5.19	−0.11	375	G8III	
GN And		28	GN	2628	2355	00^{h} 30^{m} 07.34^{s}	+29° 45′ 06.1″	5.20	1.43	185	A7III	low-amplitude δ Sct variable, ΔV = 0.05^{m}, P = 0.0693041 d
14 And		14		221345	116076	23^{h} 31^{m} 17.20^{s}	+39° 14′ 11.0″	5.22	0.80	249	K0III	Veritate, suspected variable; has a planet (b)
49 And	A (Note: Flamsteed lettered it as ξ.)	49		9057	6999	01^{h} 30^{m} 06.10^{s}	+47° 00′ 26.6″	5.27	0.53	290	K0III	
32 And		32		3817	3231	00^{h} 41^{m} 07.20^{s}	+39° 27′ 31.2″	5.30	0.18	344	G8III	
4 And		4		218452	114200	23^{h} 07^{m} 39.28^{s}	+46° 23′ 14.3″	5.30	0.20	342	K5III	double star
6 Per	(h) (Note: Flamsteed lettered it as h Per.)	(6)		13530	10366	02^{h} 13^{m} 36.02^{s}	+51° 03′ 58.4″	5.31	1.38	199	G8III:var	spectroscopic binary; suspected variable
62 And	c	62		14212	10819	02^{h} 19^{m} 16.85^{s}	+47° 22′ 48.0″	5.31	0.84	255	A1V	
18 And		18		222304	116709	23^{h} 39^{m} 08.35^{s}	+50° 28′ 18.3″	5.35	−0.04	390	B9V	
55 And		55		11428	8814	01^{h} 53^{m} 17.35^{s}	+40° 43′ 47.3″	5.42	−0.67	540	K1III	double star
11 And		11		219945	115152	23^{h} 19^{m} 29.79^{s}	+48° 37′ 30.7″	5.44	0.43	328	K0III	
				3421	2942	00^{h} 37^{m} 21.23^{s}	+35° 23′ 58.2″	5.45	−2.03	1022	G5III	
36 And		36		5286	4288	00^{h} 54^{m} 58.02^{s}	+23° 37′ 42.4″	5.46	2.51	127	K1IV	suspected variable
V340 And		15	V340	221756	116354	23^{h} 34^{m} 37.55^{s}	+40° 14′ 11.6″	5.55	1.28	233	A1III	low-amplitude δ Sct variable, ΔV = 0.007^{m}
PZ And		63	PZ	14392	10944	02^{h} 20^{m} 58.17^{s}	+50° 09′ 05.5″	5.57	0.38	356	B9p Si	α^{2} CVn variable, ΔV = 0.05^{m}, P = 4.189 d
47 And		47		8374	6514	01^{h} 23^{m} 40.56^{s}	+37° 42′ 54.0″	5.60	1.54	211	A1m	
				10204	7825	01^{h} 40^{m} 39.56^{s}	+43° 17′ 51.9″	5.63	1.05	268	A9IV:	
44 And		44		6920	5493	01^{h} 10^{m} 18.85^{s}	+42° 04′ 53.7″	5.67	2.06	172	F8V	
5 And		5		218470	114210	23^{h} 07^{m} 45.25^{s}	+49° 17′ 43.6″	5.68	3.02	111	F5V	
HD 5788				5788	4675	01^{h} 00^{m} 03.55^{s}	+44° 42′ 47.9″	5.69	0.14	420	A2Vn	binary star with HD 5789
56 And		56		11749	9021	01^{h} 56^{m} 09.23^{s}	+37° 15′ 06.5″	5.69	0.73	320	G8III...	multiple star
23 And		23		905	1086	00^{h} 13^{m} 30.94^{s}	+41° 02′ 08.6″	5.71	2.99	114	F0IV	
HD 16028				16028	12072	02^{h} 35^{m} 38.74^{s}	+37° 18′ 44.2″	5.72	−0.86	676	K4III	triple star
V388 And		13	V388	220885	115755	23^{h} 27^{m} 07.33^{s}	+42° 54′ 43.1″	5.75	0.97	294	B9III	α^{2} CVn variable, V_{max} = 5.73^{m}, V_{min} = 5.77^{m}, P = 1.47931 d
12 And		12		220117	115280	23^{h} 20^{m} 53.17^{s}	+38° 10′ 56.9″	5.77	2.63	138	F5V	triple star
				1632	1657	00^{h} 20^{m} 45.54^{s}	+32° 54′ 40.4″	5.79	−0.69	646	K5III	
45 And		45		7019	5550	01^{h} 11^{m} 10.29^{s}	+37° 43′ 26.9″	5.80	−1.44	916	B7III-IV	double star
HD 14622				14622	11090	02^{h} 22^{m} 50.36^{s}	+41° 23′ 47.5″	5.81	2.44	154	F0III-IV	has two optical companions
10 And		10		219981	115191	23^{h} 19^{m} 52.38^{s}	+42° 04′ 40.9″	5.81	−0.30	542	M0III	
HD 222109				222109	116582	23^{h} 37^{m} 32.03^{s}	+44° 25′ 44.5″	5.81	−1.20	823	B8V	double star
HD 224635				224635	118281	23^{h} 59^{m} 29.33^{s}	+33° 43′ 26.9″	5.81	3.50	95	F8	multiple star
OU And			OU	223460	117503	23^{h} 49^{m} 40.96^{s}	+36° 25′ 31.4″	5.86	0.21	440	G1IIIe	FK Com variable, ΔV = 0.07^{m}, P = 24.2 d
				1439	1493	00^{h} 18^{m} 38.22^{s}	+31° 31′ 02.0″	5.88	−0.23	543	A0IV	
HD 2767				2767	2475	00^{h} 31^{m} 25.61^{s}	+33° 34′ 54.1″	5.88	0.10	467	K1III...	binary star
HD 1606				1606	1630	00^{h} 20^{m} 24.39^{s}	+30° 56′ 08.2″	5.89	−0.37	582	B7V	suspected variable
				11727	9001	01^{h} 55^{m} 54.47^{s}	+37° 16′ 40.1″	5.89	−1.52	991	K5III	optical component of 56 And
KK And			KK	9531	7321	01^{h} 34^{m} 16.60^{s}	+37° 14′ 13.9″	5.90	0.50	392	B8Vp(Si)	α^{2} CVn variable, ΔV = 0.012^{m}, P = 0.6684 d
				16176	12181	02^{h} 36^{m} 57.08^{s}	+38° 44′ 02.3″	5.91	2.24	177	F5V	
6 And		6		218804	114430	23^{h} 10^{m} 27.36^{s}	+43° 32′ 41.1″	5.91	3.65	112	F5V	Astrometric binary
				10975	8423	01^{h} 48^{m} 38.84^{s}	+37° 57′ 10.6″	5.94	1.06	308	K0III	
39 And		39		6116	4903	01^{h} 02^{m} 54.28^{s}	+41° 20′ 42.7″	5.95	0.84	344	A5m	double star
				8671	6711	01^{h} 26^{m} 18.60^{s}	+43° 27′ 28.4″	5.98	2.90	135	F7V	
AN And		9	AN	219815	115065	23^{h} 18^{m} 23.33^{s}	+41° 46′ 25.3″	5.98	0.17	472	A7m	β Lyr variable, V_{max} = 5.96^{m}, V_{min} = 6.11^{m}, P = 3.21952 d
HD 5608				5608	4552	00^{h} 58^{m} 14.19^{s}	+33° 57′ 03.8″	5.99	2.17	190	K0	has a planet (b)
				224165	117956	23^{h} 55^{m} 33.48^{s}	+47° 21′ 21.0″	6.01	−2.46	1614	G8Ib	
				224342	118071	23^{h} 57^{m} 03.63^{s}	+42° 39′ 29.7″	6.01	−2.22	1442	F8III	
				4335	3604	00^{h} 46^{m} 10.80^{s}	+44° 51′ 41.4″	6.03	0.32	452	B9.5IIIMNp.	
				13594	10403	02^{h} 14^{m} 02.53^{s}	+47° 29′ 03.8″	6.05	2.96	135	F5V	
HD 3883				3883	3269	00^{h} 41^{m} 35.98^{s}	+24° 37′ 44.6″	6.06	0.30	462	A7m	suspected variable
V439 And			V439	166	544	00^{h} 06^{m} 36.53^{s}	+29° 01′ 19.0″	6.07	5.39	45	K0V	BY Draconis variable, ΔV = 0.04^{m}, P = 6.23 d
				5118	4185	00^{h} 53^{m} 28.22^{s}	+37° 25′ 05.9″	6.07	0.77	374	K3III:	
				221293	116030	23^{h} 30^{m} 39.54^{s}	+38° 39′ 44.0″	6.07	−0.33	621	G9III	
HD 223229				223229	117340	23^{h} 47^{m} 33.05^{s}	+46° 49′ 57.3″	6.08	−1.96	1320	B3IV	suspected variable
				225239	394	00^{h} 04^{m} 53.21^{s}	+34° 39′ 34.4″	6.09	3.26	120	G2V	
59 And A		59		13294	10176	02^{h} 10^{m} 52.83^{s}	+39° 02′ 22.5″	6.09	1.56	263	B9V	binary star
26 And		26		1438	1501	00^{h} 18^{m} 42.15^{s}	+43° 47′ 28.1″	6.10	−0.53	692	B8V	double star
				5526	4501	00^{h} 57^{m} 39.64^{s}	+45° 50′ 21.8″	6.10	0.45	439	K2III	
HD 225218				225218	365	00^{h} 04^{m} 36.60^{s}	+42° 05′ 33.2″	6.11	−2.45	1680	B9III	double star
				7647	5993	01^{h} 17^{m} 05.05^{s}	+44° 54′ 07.5″	6.11	−0.18	590	K5	
HD 1185				1185	1302	00^{h} 16^{m} 21.50^{s}	+43° 35′ 42.4″	6.12	1.28	303	A2V	double star
				218416	114162	23^{h} 07^{m} 10.05^{s}	+52° 48′ 59.6″	6.12	0.55	423	K0III	
GO And			GO	4778	3919	00^{h} 50^{m} 18.21^{s}	+45° 00′ 08.1″	6.13	1.34	296	A0p...	α^{2} CVn variable, ΔV = 0.04^{m}, P = 2.5481 d
				7158	5650	01^{h} 12^{m} 34.06^{s}	+45° 20′ 14.9″	6.13	−0.52	698	M1III	
66 And		66		15138	11465	02^{h} 27^{m} 51.75^{s}	+50° 34′ 12.7″	6.16	2.54	173	F4V	spectroscopic binary
				14372	10924	02^{h} 20^{m} 41.50^{s}	+47° 18′ 39.0″	6.17	−0.87	836	B5V	
				743	967	00^{h} 11^{m} 59.03^{s}	+48° 09′ 08.5″	6.18	0.05	550	K4III	
				3411	2926	00^{h} 37^{m} 07.20^{s}	+24° 00′ 51.3″	6.18	1.13	334	K2III	
HD 221776				221776	116365	23^{h} 34^{m} 46.73^{s}	+38° 01′ 26.3″	6.18	−0.41	678	K5	double star
				16327	12287	02^{h} 38^{m} 17.86^{s}	+37° 43′ 36.6″	6.19	1.60	270	F6III	triple star
HD 221246				221246	115996	23^{h} 30^{m} 07.39^{s}	+49° 07′ 59.3″	6.19	−0.91	856	K5III	member of the NGC 7686 star cluster
OP And			OP	9746	7493	01^{h} 36^{m} 27.21^{s}	+48° 43′ 22.2″	6.20	0.65	420	K1III:	BY Dra variable, ΔV = 0.09^{m}
				400	699	00^{h} 08^{m} 41.02^{s}	+36° 37′ 38.7″	6.21	3.61	108	F8IV	
				14213	10814	02^{h} 19^{m} 10.84^{s}	+46° 28′ 20.2″	6.21	0.50	452	A4V	
				952	1123	00^{h} 14^{m} 02.29^{s}	+33° 12′ 21.9″	6.22	1.45	293	A1V	
HD 895				895	1076	00^{h} 13^{m} 23.93^{s}	+26° 59′ 15.4″	6.24	0.78	403	G0III	triple star
				222451	116824	23^{h} 40^{m} 40.47^{s}	+36° 43′ 14.6″	6.24	3.01	144	F1V	
				224906	137	00^{h} 01^{m} 43.85^{s}	+42° 22′ 01.7″	6.25	−1.80	1331	B9IIIp Mn	
				11613	8922	01^{h} 54^{m} 53.75^{s}	+40° 42′ 07.9″	6.25	1.13	345	K2	
HD 220105				220105	115261	23^{h} 20^{m} 44.11^{s}	+44° 06′ 58.5″	6.25	1.73	261	A5Vn	double star
				221661	116292	23^{h} 33^{m} 42.99^{s}	+45° 03′ 29.1″	6.25	0.12	548	G8II	
HD 2942				2942	2583	00^{h} 32^{m} 49.09^{s}	+28° 16′ 48.8″	6.26	0.47	469	G8II	triple star
				8774	6776	01^{h} 27^{m} 06.21^{s}	+34° 22′ 39.3″	6.27	3.12	139	F7IVsvar	
				2507	2270	00^{h} 28^{m} 56.67^{s}	+36° 53′ 58.9″	6.28	0.51	464	G5III	
				8375	6512	01^{h} 23^{m} 37.31^{s}	+34° 14′ 44.2″	6.28	2.43	192	G8IV	
				11624	8930	01^{h} 54^{m} 57.63^{s}	+37° 07′ 42.0″	6.28	0.25	525	K0	
				7758	6087	01^{h} 18^{m} 10.14^{s}	+47° 25′ 11.0″	6.29	−2.07	1531	K0	
				16350	12305	02^{h} 38^{m} 27.94^{s}	+38° 05′ 21.0″	6.29	−0.47	734	B9.5V	
				219962	115171	23^{h} 19^{m} 41.37^{s}	+48° 22′ 51.1″	6.29	0.47	475	K1III	
				217314	113501	22^{h} 59^{m} 10.37^{s}	+52° 39′ 16.0″	6.31	−0.26	672	K2	
				10597	8127	01^{h} 44^{m} 26.53^{s}	+46° 08′ 23.2″	6.32	0.23	540	K5III	
				219290	114714	23^{h} 14^{m} 14.34^{s}	+50° 37′ 04.5″	6.32	0.82	411	A0V	
				10486	8044	01^{h} 43^{m} 16.39^{s}	+45° 19′ 21.5″	6.33	2.61	181	K2IV	
				10874	8370	01^{h} 47^{m} 48.00^{s}	+46° 13′ 47.6″	6.33	2.50	190	F6V	
				1075	1208	00^{h} 15^{m} 06.93^{s}	+31° 32′ 08.7″	6.34	−1.70	1320	K5	
HD 8673				8673	6702	01^{h} 26^{m} 08.62^{s}	+34° 34′ 47.7″	6.34	3.43	125	F7V	has a planet (b)
				1083	1215	00^{h} 15^{m} 10.55^{s}	+27° 17′ 00.5″	6.35	0.84	412	A1Vn	double star
				1527	1575	00^{h} 19^{m} 41.58^{s}	+40° 43′ 46.2″	6.35	0.25	541	K1III	
				221970	116505	23^{h} 36^{m} 30.52^{s}	+32° 54′ 15.1″	6.35	1.92	251	F6V	
CG And			CG	224801	63	00^{h} 00^{m} 43.62^{s}	+45° 15′ 12.0″	6.36	−0.23	678	B9p SiEu	α^{2} CVn variable, V_{max} = 6.32^{m}, V_{min} = 6.42^{m}, P = 3.73975 d
HD 16004				16004	12057	02^{h} 35^{m} 27.89^{s}	+39° 39′ 52.1″	6.36	0.11	580	B9MNp...	triple star
				13818	10562	02^{h} 15^{m} 57.69^{s}	+47° 48′ 43.4″	6.37	0.61	462	G9III-IV	
LN And			LN	217811	113802	23^{h} 02^{m} 45.15^{s}	+44° 03′ 31.6″	6.37	−1.42	1177	B2V	double star; not variable despite designation
V385 And			V385	220524	115530	23^{h} 24^{m} 08.88^{s}	+41° 36′ 46.3″	6.37	−1.55	1249	M0	irregular variable, V_{max} = 6.36^{m}, V_{min} = 6.47^{m}
GY And			GY	9996	7651	01^{h} 38^{m} 31.84^{s}	+45° 23′ 58.9″	6.38	0.66	455	B9Vp (Cr-Eu)	Promethium lines; α^{2} CVn variable, V_{max} = 6.27^{m}, V_{min} = 6.44^{m}, P = 8000 d
				13013	9983	02^{h} 08^{m} 33.55^{s}	+44° 27′ 34.4″	6.38	0.78	430	G8III	
				218365	114152	23^{h} 07^{m} 04.99^{s}	+35° 38′ 11.3″	6.38	−0.08	638	K0	
				9712	7444	01^{h} 35^{m} 52.46^{s}	+41° 04′ 35.1″	6.39	1.01	388	K1III	
V529 And			V529	8801	6794	01^{h} 27^{m} 26.67^{s}	+41° 06′ 04.0″	6.42	2.69	182	Am...	δ Scuti variable, ΔV = 0.03^{m}, P = 0.40331 d
				217731	113750	23^{h} 02^{m} 11.32^{s}	+44° 34′ 22.4″	6.43	1.22	359	K0	
HD 222641				222641	116941	23^{h} 42^{m} 14.68^{s}	+44° 59′ 30.3″	6.43	−0.48	786	K5III	suspected variable
HD 7853				7853	6140	01^{h} 18^{m} 47.02^{s}	+37° 23′ 10.7″	6.44	0.71	456	A5m	double star
				14221	10830	02^{h} 19^{m} 22.77^{s}	+48° 57′ 19.0″	6.44	2.39	210	F4V	
				219668	114981	23^{h} 17^{m} 16.59^{s}	+45° 09′ 51.5″	6.44	2.10	241	K0IV	
HD 6114				6114	4911	01^{h} 03^{m} 01.47^{s}	+47° 22′ 34.3″	6.46	1.39	337	A9V	double star
				11884	9163	01^{h} 57^{m} 59.23^{s}	+47° 05′ 43.9″	6.48	−1.24	1140	K0	
ET And			ET	219749	115036	23^{h} 17^{m} 55.99^{s}	+45° 29′ 20.2″	6.48	0.36	545	B9Vp(Si)	α^{2} CVn variable, ΔV = 0.03^{m}, P = 1.61888 d
HD 222399				222399	116781	23^{h} 40^{m} 02.82^{s}	+37° 39′ 10.2″	6.49	1.74	291	F2IV	double star
PY And			PY	3322	2865	00^{h} 36^{m} 20.00^{s}	+27° 15′ 17″	6.50	-0.16	701	B8IIImnp...	α^{2} CVn variable, ΔV = ~0.03^{m}
				800	1009	00^{h} 12^{m} 34.08^{s}	+44° 42′ 26.1″	6.50	0.50	517	K0	
59 And B		59		13295	10180	02^{h} 10^{m} 53.67^{s}	+39° 02′ 36.0″	6.82	−1.76	1698	A1Vn	component of the 59 And system
HD 222155				222155	116616	23^{h} 38^{m} 00^{s}	+48° 59′ 47″	7.1	3.65	160	G2V	has a planet (b)
HD 16175				16175	12191	02^{h} 37^{m} 01.91^{s}	+42° 03′ 45.5″	7.28	3.40	195	G0	Buna; has a planet (b)
R And			R	1967	1901	00^{h} 24^{m} 01.95^{s}	+38° 34′ 37.3″	7.39	-5.19	790	S6.5IIIeZr6Ti2	Mira variable, V_{max} = 5.8^{m}, V_{min} = 15.2^{m}, P = 409.2 d
HD 1605				1605	1640	00^{h} 20^{m} 32.0^{s}	+30° 58′ 29″	7.52	2.88	276	K1IV	has two planets (b & c)
HD 13931				13931	10626	02^{h} 16^{m} 47.38^{s}	+43° 46′ 22.8″	7.52	4.3	144	G0	has a planet (b)
HD 5583				5583		00^{h} 57^{m} 57.0^{s}	+34° 59′ 08″	7.6	0.88	721	K0	has a planet (b)
RW And			RW	4489		00^{h} 47^{m} 18.92^{s}	+32° 41′ 08.6″	7.9	-0.52	1375	M5e-M10e(S6,2e)	Mira variable, V_{max} = 7.9^{m}, V_{min} = 15.7^{m}, P = 430 d
Groombridge 34				1326	1475	00^{h} 18^{m} 22.9^{s}	+44° 01′ 22″	8.01	10.25	11.62	M6Ve + M1Ve	16th closest star system, binary; both components GQ and GX And flare stars
HD 15082				15082	11397	02^{h} 26^{m} 51.06^{s}	+37° 33′ 01.7″	8.3	3.0	377	A5	has a transiting planet WASP-33b
RU And			RU			01^{h} 38^{m} 37^{s}	38° 40′ 12″	9.9			M5e-M6e	a variable star in the constellation of Andromeda. It is classified as a semiregular variable pulsating giant star, and varies from an apparent visual magnitude of 14.5 at minimum brightness to a magnitude of 9.9 at maximum brightness, with a period of approximately 238.3 days.
Y And				10112		01^{h} 39^{m} 36.89^{s}	+39° 20′ 35″	10.39		8,000	M3-4.5e	Mira Cet variable
Z And			Z	221650	116287	23^{h} 33^{m} 39.95^{s}	+48° 49′ 05.9″	10.53	2.38	1393	M2III + B1eq	prototype of Z And variables, V_{max} = 7.7^{m}, V_{min} = 11.3^{m}
HAT-P-6						23^{h} 39^{m} 05.81^{s}	+42° 27′ 57.5″	10.54	4.03	650	F	Sterrennacht; has a transiting planet (b)
HAT-P-16						00^{h} 38^{m} 17.56^{s}	+42° 27′ 47.2″	10.8	3.9	766	F8	has a transiting planet (b)
HAT-P-32						02^{h} 01^{m} 10^{s}	+46° 41′ 16″	11.29	3.76	1044	F/G	has a transiting planet (b)
WASP-1						00^{h} 20^{m} 40.08^{s}	+31° 59′ 23.8″	11.79	3.89	1239	F7V	has a transiting planet (b)
Ross 248						23^{h} 41^{m} 54.99^{s}	+44° 10′ 40.8″	12.29	14.79	10.32	M6e	HH And; 8th closest star system, flare star
HAT-P-19						00^{h} 38^{m} 04^{s}	+34° 42′ 42″	12.9	6.24	701	K	has a transiting planet (b)
HAT-P-28						00^{h} 52^{m} 00^{s}	+34° 43′ 42″	13.03	5.05	1288	G3	has a transiting planet (b)
HAT-P-53						01^{h} 27^{m} 29.0^{s}	+38° 58′ 05″	13.73	4.45	2345		has a transiting planet (b)
S And			S			00^{h} 42^{m} 43.11^{s}	+41° 16′ 04.2″			2600000	Ia	SN 1885A; BD+40°147a; type Ia supernova in the Andromeda Galaxy, V_{max} = 5.8^{m}, V_{min} = < 16^{m}
Table legend: • Name = Proper name • B = Bayer designation • F or/and G. = Flamsteed designation or Gould designation • Var = Variable-star designation • HD = Henry Draper Catalogue designation number • HIP = Hipparcos Catalogue designation number • RA = Right ascension for the Epoch/Equinox J2000.0 • Dec = Declination for the Epoch/Equinox J2000.0 • vis. mag. = visual magnitude (m or m_{v}), also known as apparent magnitude • abs. mag. = absolute magnitude (M_{v}) • Dist. (ly) = Distance in light-years from Earth • Sp. class = Spectral class of the star in the stellar classification system • Notes = Common name(s) or alternate name(s); comments; notable properties [for example: multiple star status, range of variability if it is a variable star, exoplanets, etc.]

== See also ==
- List of stars by constellation
