= Red clump =

Clustering of stars in astronomy diagram

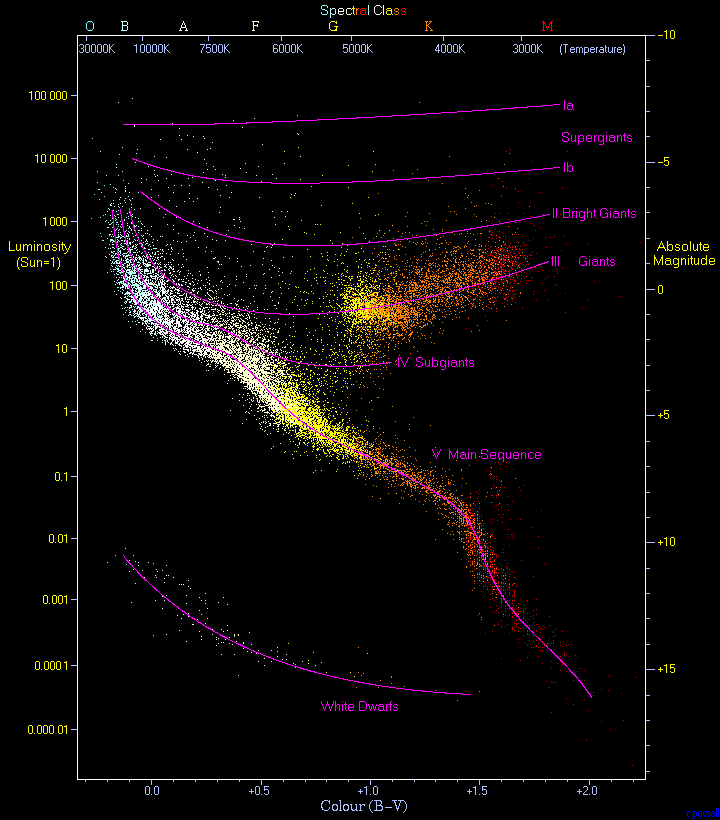
The red clump is the prominent group of red giant stars at about 5,000 K and 75 L_{☉}.

The red clump is a clustering of red giants in the Hertzsprung–Russell diagram at around 5,000 K and absolute magnitude (M_{V}) +0.5, slightly hotter than most red-giant-branch stars of the same luminosity. It is visible as a denser region of the red-giant branch or a bulge towards hotter temperatures. It is prominent in many galactic open clusters, and it is also noticeable in many intermediate-age globular clusters and in nearby field stars (e.g. the Hipparcos stars).

The red clump giants are cool horizontal branch stars, stars originally similar to the Sun which have undergone a helium flash and are now fusing helium in their cores.

== Properties ==
Red clump stellar properties vary depending on their origin, most notably on the metallicity of the stars, but typically they have early K spectral types and effective temperatures around 5,000 K. The absolute visual magnitude of red clump giants near the sun has been measured at an average of +0.81 with metallicities between −0.6 and +0.4 dex.

There is a considerable spread in the properties of red clump stars even within a single population of similar stars such as an open cluster. This is partly due to the natural variation in temperatures and luminosities of horizontal branch stars when they form and as they evolve, and partly due to the presence of other stars with similar properties. Although red clump stars are generally hotter than red-giant-branch stars, the two regions overlap and the status of individual stars can only be assigned with a detailed chemical abundance study.

== Evolution ==
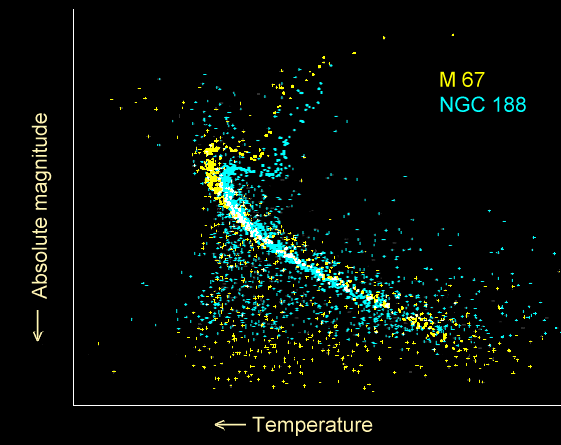
Old open clusters showing barely detectable red clumps

Modelling of the horizontal branch has shown that stars have a strong tendency to cluster at the cool end of the zero age horizontal branch (ZAHB). This tendency is weaker in low metallicity stars, so the red clump is usually more prominent in metal-rich clusters. However, there are other effects, and there are well-populated red clumps in some metal-poor globular clusters.

Stars with a similar mass to the sun evolve towards the tip of the red-giant branch with a degenerate helium core. More massive stars leave the red-giant branch early and perform a blue loop, but all stars with a degenerate core reach the tip with very similar core masses, temperatures, and luminosities. After the helium flash they lie along the ZAHB, all with helium cores just under 0.5 M_{☉} and their properties determined mostly by the size of the hydrogen envelope outside the core. Lower envelope masses result in weaker hydrogen shell fusion and give hotter and slightly less luminous stars strung along the horizontal branch. Different initial masses and natural variations in mass loss rates on the red-giant branch cause the variations in the envelope masses even though the helium cores are all the same size. Low-metallicity stars are more sensitive to the size of the hydrogen envelope, so with the same envelope masses they are spread further along the horizontal branch and fewer fall in the red clump.

Although red clump stars lie consistently to the hot side of the red-giant branch that they evolved from, red clump and red-giant-branch stars from different populations can overlap. This occurs in ω Centauri where metal-poor red-giant-branch stars have the same or hotter temperatures as more metal-rich red clump giants.

Other stars, not strictly horizontal branch stars, can lie in the same region of the H-R diagram. Stars too massive to develop a degenerate helium core on the red-giant branch will ignite helium before the tip of the red-giant branch and perform a blue loop. For stars only a little more massive than the sun, around 2 M_{☉}, the blue loop is very short and at a luminosity similar to the red clump giants. These stars are an order of magnitude less common than sun-like stars, even rarer compared to the sub-solar stars that can form red clump giants, and the duration of the blue loop is far less than the time spent by a red clump giant on the horizontal branch. This means that these imposters are much less common in the H–R diagram, but still detectable.

Stars with 2–3 M_{☉} will also pass through the red clump as they evolve along the subgiant branch. This is again a very rapid phase of evolution, but stars such as OU Andromedae are found in the red clump region (5,500 K and 100 L_{☉}) even though it is thought to be a subgiant crossing the Hertzsprung gap.

== Standard candles ==
In theory, the absolute luminosities of stars in the red clump are fairly independent of stellar composition or age so that consequently they make good standard candles for estimating astronomical distances both within our galaxy and to nearby galaxies and clusters. Variations due to metallicity, mass, age, and extinctions affect visual observations too much for them to be useful, but the effects are much smaller in the infrared. Near infrared I band observations in particular have been used to establish red clump distances. Absolute magnitudes for the red clump at solar metallicity have been measured at −0.22 in the I band and −1.54 in the K band. The distance to the Galactic Center has been measured in this way, giving a result of 7.52 kpc in agreement with other methods.

== Red bump ==
The red clump should not be confused with the "red bump" or red-giant-branch bump, which is a less noticeable clustering of giants partway along the red-giant branch, caused as stars ascending the red-giant branch temporarily decrease in luminosity because of the outgoing hydrogen burning shell encountering the chemical discontinuity left behind by previous convection.

== Examples ==
Many of the bright "red giants" visible in the sky are actually G or early K class red-clump stars. Pollux, the closest red giant to the Sun, is believed to be a red-clump star. Other well-known examples include:

- Capella Aa
- ε Tauri
- β Ceti
- α Cassiopeiae
- δ Andromedae

Arcturus has sometimes been thought to be a clump giant, but is now more commonly considered to be on the red-giant branch, somewhat cooler and more luminous than a red-clump star.
