= HD 221246 =

Star in the open cluster NGC 7686

Café de Mayo
Observation data Epoch J2000 Equinox ICRS
- Constellation: Andromeda
- Right ascension: 23^{h} 30^{m} 07.4133^{s}
- Declination: +49° 07′ 59.323″
- Apparent magnitude (V): 6.17

Characteristics
- Spectral type: K3III
- U−B color index: 1.71
- B−V color index: 1.46

Astrometry
Radial velocity (R_{v})	−8.41±0.15 km/s
Proper motion (μ)	RA: 28.741±0.100 mas/yr Dec.: 3.180±0.087 mas/yr
Parallax (π)	3.2290±0.0642 mas
Distance	1,010 ± 20 ly (310 ± 6 pc)
Absolute magnitude (M_{V})	−0.97

Details
Mass	1.4 M_{☉}
Radius	44 R_{☉}
Luminosity	690 L_{☉}
Surface gravity (log g)	1.20 cgs
Temperature	4,285 K
Metallicity [Fe/H]	−0.24±0.10 dex

Other designations
- BD+48°4070, FK5 3882, HD 221246, HIP 115996, HR 8925, NGC 7686 1, SAO 53088

Database references
SIMBAD	data

HD 221246 or NGC 7686 1 is a star in open cluster NGC 7686, and it belongs to the northern constellation of Andromeda. With an apparent visual magnitude of 6.17, it can be viewed by the naked eye only under very favourable conditions. It has a spectral classification of K3III, meaning it is an evolved orange giant star. Parallax measurements place this star about 1,000 light years away from the Solar System.
