= HD 8673 =

Binary star in the constellation Andromeda

Observation data Epoch J2000 Equinox J2000
- Constellation: Andromeda
- Right ascension: 01^{h} 26^{m} 08.78637^{s}
- Declination: +34° 34′ 46.9318″
- Apparent magnitude (V): 6.34

Characteristics
- Evolutionary stage: main sequence
- Spectral type: F7 V + M2 V
- B−V color index: 0.500±0.004

Astrometry
Radial velocity (R_{v})	19.08±0.14 km/s
Proper motion (μ)	RA: 236.271±0.030 mas/yr Dec.: −84.632±0.022 mas/yr
Parallax (π)	26.2036±0.0370 mas
Distance	124.5 ± 0.2 ly (38.16 ± 0.05 pc)
Absolute magnitude (M_{V})	3.56

Orbit
Semi-major axis (a)	35–60 AU
Eccentricity (e)	< 0.5
Inclination (i)	75–85°

Details

HD 8673 A
Mass	1.36±0.20 M_{☉}
Radius	1.521±0.049 R_{☉}
Luminosity	3.37+0.51 −0.44 L_{☉}
Surface gravity (log g)	4.21 cgs
Temperature	6,340 K
Metallicity [Fe/H]	0.15 dex
Rotational velocity (v sin i)	26.9 km/s
Age	1.5+2.1 −0.6 Gyr

HD 8673 B
Mass	0.33–0.45 M_{☉}
Temperature	3,520-3,690 K

Other designations
- BD+33°228, HD 8673, HIP 6702, HR 410, SAO 54695, PPM 66283, WDS J01262+3435AB, IRAS 01232+3418, 2MASS J01260875+3434471, Gaia DR2 317350357498173312

Database references
SIMBAD	data

HD 8673 is a binary star in the northern constellation of Andromeda. It has an apparent magnitude and absolute magnitude of 6.34 and 3.56 respectively. Based upon an annual parallax shift of 26.2 mas, the system is located around 124.5 light years away. The system is moving further from the Earth with a heliocentric radial velocity of +19 km/s. A sub-stellar companion was detected in 2005; it could either be an exoplanet or a brown dwarf.

The primary component is an F-type main-sequence star with a stellar classification of F7 V. It has 1.36 times the mass of the Sun and 1.52 times the Sun's radius. The star is around 1.5 billion years old and is spinning with a projected rotational velocity of 26.9 km/s. It is radiating 3.4 times the Sun's luminosity from its photosphere at an effective temperature of 6,340 K.

Speckle interferometry measurements of this star between 2001 and 2008 showed a candidate stellar companion to this star, announced in 2011. It was unclear whether the pair formed a visual double or a binary system. The authors of the study estimated a class of K2 V, based upon a visual magnitude difference of 2.3±0.5. Subsequent observations using adaptive options did not spot this companion and it was concluded this was a false detection. However, a low mass stellar companion was detected in a wide orbit. This red dwarf star has 0.33–0.45 times the mass of the Sun and is orbiting with a semimajor axis of 35–60 AU.

== Planetary system ==
An orbiting sub-stellar companion with a minimum mass 14 times that of Jupiter in a high-eccentricity orbit was discovered in 2005 and confirmed in 2010. This object orbits at 3 AU away from the primary star with a period of 1,634 days and an eccentricity of 0.7. In 2022, the inclination and true mass of HD 8673 Ab were measured via astrometry.

The HD 8673 A planetary system
Companion (in order from star)	Mass	Semimajor axis (AU)	Orbital period (years)	Eccentricity	Inclination	Radius
b	13.248+1.688 −1.416 M_{J}	2.970+0.147 −0.171	4.503+0.030 −0.043	0.730+0.042 −0.026	95.450+19.444 −8.816°	—
