= ET Andromedae =

Star in the constellation Andromeda

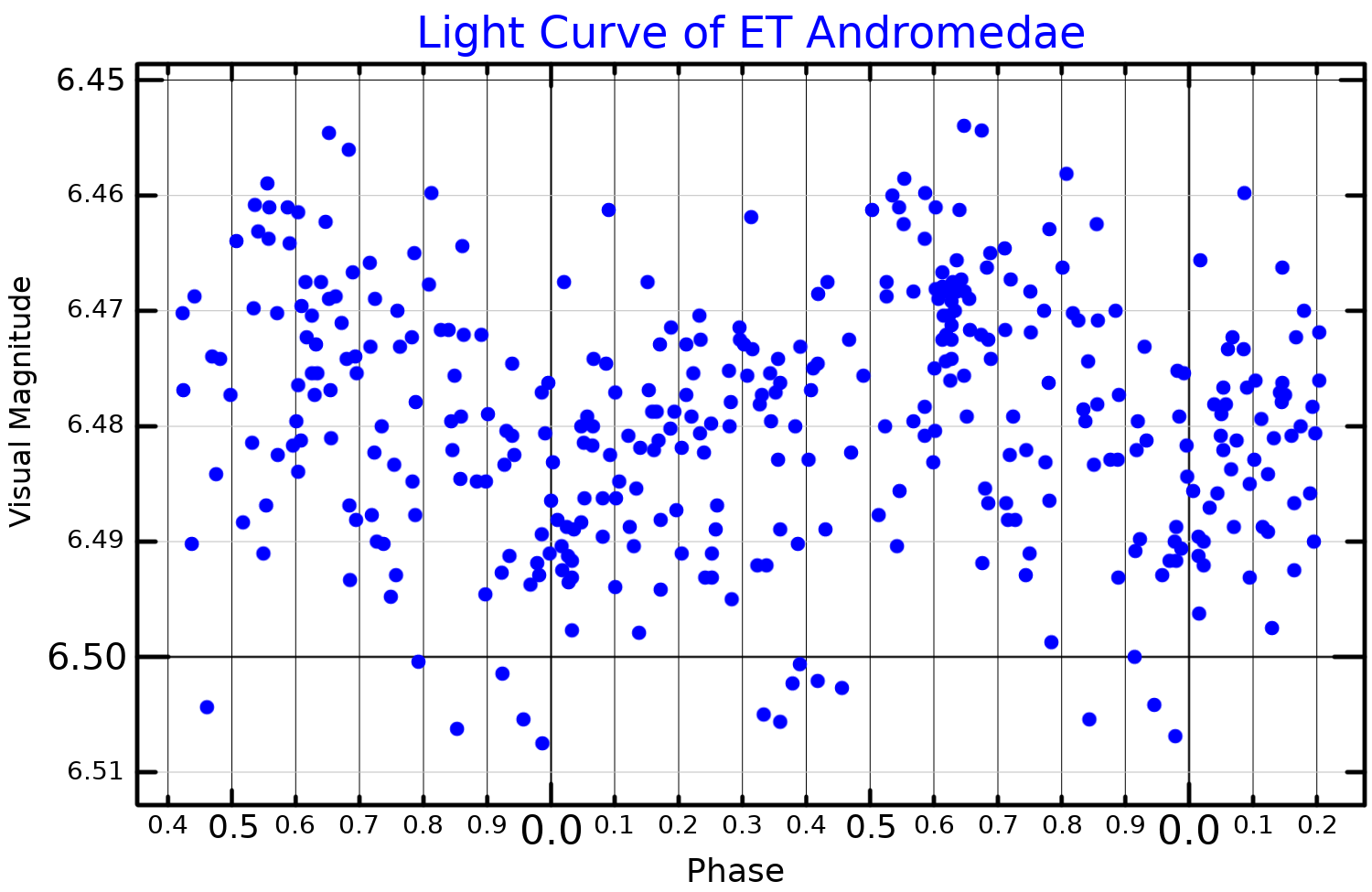
- The visual band light curve of ET Andromedae, adapted from Blanco et al. (1980)

Observation data Epoch J2000 Equinox ICRS
- Constellation: Andromeda
- Right ascension: 23^{h} 17^{m} 56.01118^{s}
- Declination: +45° 29′ 20.1197″
- Apparent magnitude (V): 6.48

Characteristics
- Spectral type: A0 Vp SiSr or B9p SI
- B−V color index: −0.037±0.006
- Variable type: α^{2} CVn

Astrometry
| Radial velocity (R_{v}) | −0.30±4.10 km/s |
| Proper motion (μ) | RA: +24.740 mas/yr Dec.: −11.038 mas/yr |
| Parallax (π) | 5.4200±0.0572 mas |
| Distance | 602 ± 6 ly (185 ± 2 pc) |
| Absolute magnitude (M_{V}) | 0.58 |

Orbit
| Period (P) | 48.304±0.007 d |
| Eccentricity (e) | 0.50±0.05 |
| Periastron epoch (T) | 2443720.11±0.64 JD |
| Argument of periastron (ω) (secondary) | 49.8±6.0° |
| Semi-amplitude (K_{1}) (primary) | 25.7±2.0 km/s |

Details
| Mass | 3.25 M_{☉} |
| Radius | 2.7 R_{☉} |
| Luminosity | 91.06 L_{☉} |
| Surface gravity (log g) | 3.81 cgs |
| Temperature | 11,444 K |
| Rotation | 1.62 d |
| Rotational velocity (v sin i) | 65 km/s |
| Age | 284 Myr |

Other designations
- AG+45° 2124, BD+44° 4373, HD 219749, HIP 115036, HR 8861, SAO 52876, PPM 64037, TYC 3636-2562-1, GSC 03636-02562, 2MASS J23175600+4529201

Database references
| SIMBAD | data |

ET Andromedae is a binary star system star in the northern constellation of Andromeda. It has an apparent visual magnitude of 6.48, placing it at the nominal limit for visibility with the naked eye. The distance to this system can be estimated from its annual parallax shift of 5.42 mas, which yields a value of 602 light years.

Variations in the radial velocity of this star suggest it is a single-lined spectroscopic binary system. This yields orbital elements with a period of 48.3 days and an eccentricity of 0.50. The a sin i value for the primary is 14.8 Gm (0.099 AU), where a is the semimajor axis and i is the (unknown) orbital inclination.

The visible component is a well-studied magnetic chemically peculiar star with a stellar classification of A0 Vp SiSr. The SiSr notation indicates unusual abundances of silicon and strontium in the spectrum. It has a magnetic field with an average surface value of 3.2 kT. The abundance of silicon varies depending on the viewing angle.

In 1953, Sanford S. Provin announced that HD 219749 might be photometrically variable, based on observations made at Yerkes Observatory. Variability was confirmed from Lowell Observatory measurements published by Karl D. Rakos in 1962. The star is an Alpha^{2} Canum Venaticorum variable with a period of 1.618875 days.
