= HD 2421 =

Spectroscopic binary star system in the constellation Andromeda

Observation data Epoch J2000.0 Equinox ICRS
- Constellation: Andromeda
- Right ascension: 00^{h} 28^{m} 13.6588^{s}
- Declination: +44° 23′ 40.109″
- Apparent magnitude (V): 5.173

Characteristics
- Spectral type: A2Vs + F2V

Astrometry
Radial velocity (R_{v})	2.0±0.9 km/s
Proper motion (μ)	RA: 82.361±0.197 mas/yr Dec.: −16.244±0.119 mas/yr
Parallax (π)	11.2634±0.1621 mas
Distance	290 ± 4 ly (89 ± 1 pc)
Absolute magnitude (M_{V})	+0.49

Orbit
Period (P)	3.95529±0.00003 d
Semi-major axis (a)	≥ 0.0176±0.0006 AU
Eccentricity (e)	0.135±0.011
Periastron epoch (T)	2448523.14±0.04
Argument of periastron (ω) (secondary)	280±4°
Argument of periastron (ω) (primary)	91±8°
Semi-amplitude (K_{1}) (primary)	49.1±0.6 km/s
Semi-amplitude (K_{2}) (secondary)	81.1±1.0 km/s

Details

A
Mass	2.31 M_{☉}
Luminosity	9,875 L_{☉}
Surface gravity (log g)	4.26 cgs
Rotational velocity (v sin i)	3.0±0.2 km/s
Age	413 Myr

B
Surface gravity (log g)	4.26 cgs
Temperature	7,200 K
Rotational velocity (v sin i)	8.0±0.4 km/s

Other designations
- BD+43°92, HD 2421, HIP 2225, HR 104, SAO 36390

Database references
SIMBAD	data

HD 2421 is a multiple star system in the constellation Andromeda. It is faintly visible to the naked eye with a combined apparent visual magnitude of 5.17. Based on parallax measurements, it is located at a distance of approximately 290 light years from the Sun. The system is drifting further away with a radial velocity of ~2 km/s.

This is a double-lined spectroscopic binary with an orbital period of 3.96 days and an eccentricity of 0.135. The variable radial velocity was first reported by Robert Horace Baker in 1909 and the first orbit computed by Stella Udick in 1912. A refined orbit was published in 1993 resulting in updated orbital parameters, and in the assessment of a period shift with respect to the 1912 observations.

The primary member of the pair, designated component A, has a stellar classification of A2 Vs, indicating a sharp-lined A-type main-sequence star. The element abundances are similar to those in the Sun. The fainter and cooler secondary, component B, is also a sharp-lined star with a class of F2V, matching an F-type main-sequence star.

A steady variation in the motion of the system suggests the influence of a third component. In 2015 a faint companion, component C, was detected ~ 0.1″ to the southwest of the main pair. This star has about 1.1 times the mass of the Sun, and, if gravitationally bound, is orbiting with a period of around 16 years at a distance of 10.5 AU.
