= OP Andromedae =

Variable star in the constellation Andromeda

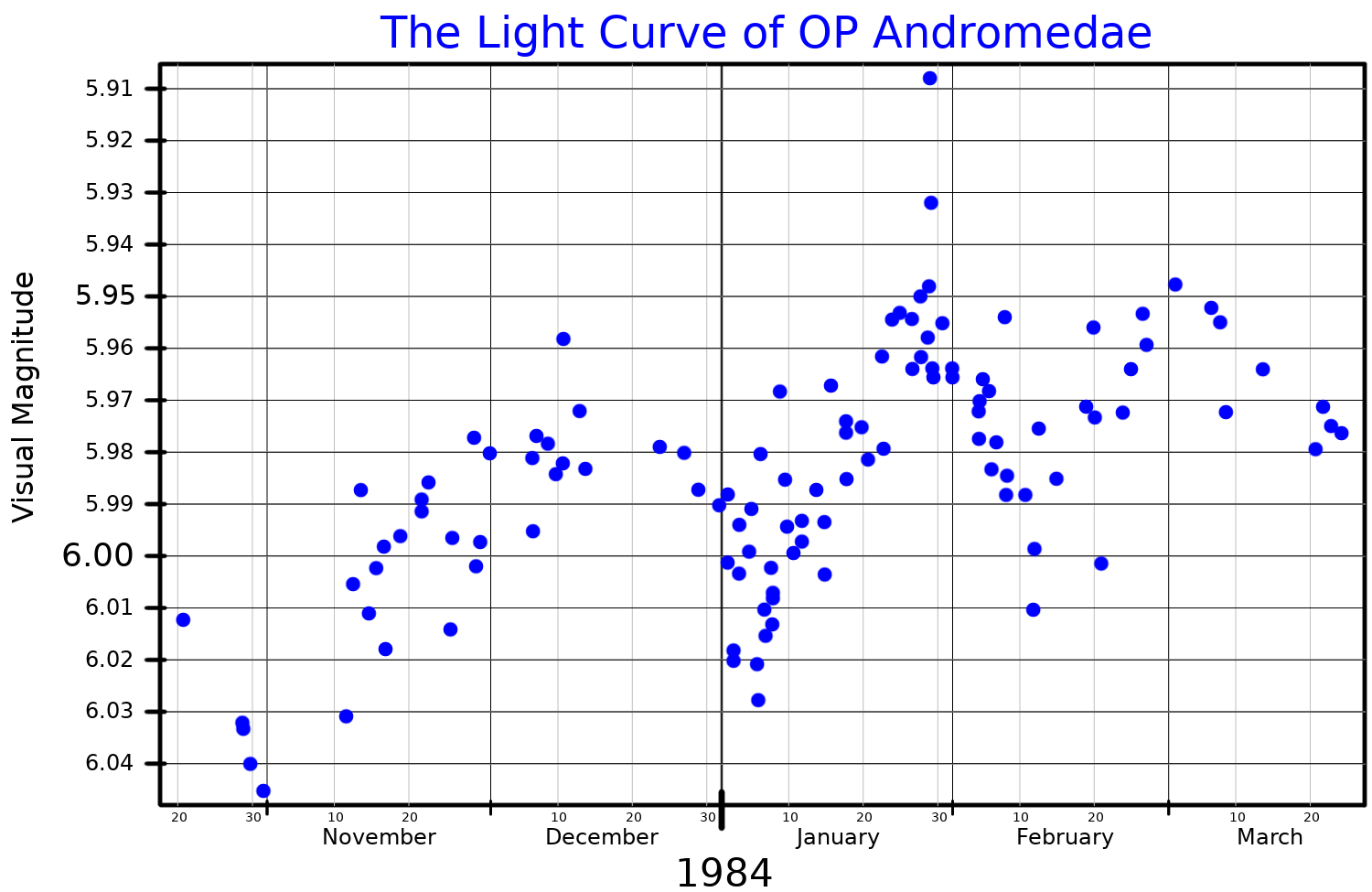
- The visual band light curve of OP Andromedae, adapted from Barksdale et al. (1984)

Observation data Epoch J2000 Equinox ICRS
- Constellation: Andromeda
- Right ascension: 01^{h} 36^{m} 27.20059^{s}
- Declination: +48° 43′ 22.000″
- Apparent magnitude (V): 6.27 - 6.41

Characteristics
- Evolutionary stage: red giant branch
- Spectral type: K1III
- Apparent magnitude (J): 3.794
- Apparent magnitude (H): 3.165
- Apparent magnitude (K): 2.914
- B−V color index: 1.2478
- Variable type: RS CVn

Astrometry
Radial velocity (R_{v})	−42.78±0.12 km/s
Proper motion (μ)	RA: −15.676±0.050 mas/yr Dec.: −17.705±0.031 mas/yr
Parallax (π)	6.3390±0.0435 mas
Distance	515 ± 4 ly (158 ± 1 pc)
Absolute magnitude (M_{V})	0.37 ± 0.23

Details
Mass	1.5 – 3 M_{☉}
Radius	16.1±2.2 R_{☉}
Luminosity	128.825 L_{☉}
Surface gravity (log g)	2.14 cgs
Temperature	4,490 K
Metallicity [Fe/H]	-0.10 dex
Rotational velocity (v sin i)	7.2 km/s

Other designations
- 2MASS J01362720+4843221, BD+47°460, HD 9746, HIP 7493, SAO 37351, PPM 44205, HR 454, TYC 3282-2270-1

Database references
SIMBAD	data

OP Andromedae is a variable star in the constellation Andromeda. Varying between magnitudes 6.27 and 6.41 over 2.36 days, it has been classified as an RS Canum Venaticorum variable, but there has not been any proof of binarity, yet. It is a red giant star with a spectral classification of K1III.

OP Andromedae is one of the few red giant stars where it was detected an overabundance of ^{7}Li. The mechanism that enhances lithium in red giants is still unknown. It was proposed that those stars engulfed planets in the recent past; however, this theory was discarded since there is an overabundance of just one lithium isotope.
