= HD 2942 =

Triple star system in the constellation Andromeda

Observation data Epoch J2000 Equinox ICRS
- Constellation: Andromeda
- A
- Right ascension: 00^{h} 32^{m} 49.0863^{s}
- Declination: +28° 16′ 48.868″
- Apparent magnitude (V): 6.33
- B
- Right ascension: 00^{h} 32^{m} 49.3227^{s}
- Declination: +28° 16′ 40.831″
- Apparent magnitude (V): 11.26

Characteristics
- Spectral type: K0III+G6V+G8V
- U−B color index: 0.80
- B−V color index: 0.99

Astrometry

A
Radial velocity (R_{v})	−10.50±0.14 km/s
Proper motion (μ)	RA: −5.695±0.072 mas/yr Dec.: 6.101±0.039 mas/yr
Parallax (π)	5.8690±0.0434 mas
Distance	556 ± 4 ly (170 ± 1 pc)

Orbit
Primary	HD 2942Ba
Name	HD 2942Bb
Period (P)	7.4887 days
Eccentricity (e)	0.055
Periastron epoch (T)	HJD 2,451,060.5586
Argument of periastron (ω) (secondary)	293.40°
Semi-amplitude (K_{1}) (primary)	64.01 km/s
Semi-amplitude (K_{2}) (secondary)	66.34 km/s

Details

HD 2942A
Mass	3.17 M_{☉}

HD 2942B
Mass	0.89 (Ba) 0.85 (Bb) M_{☉}

Other designations
- HIP 2583, HR 134, BD+27°84, SAO 74090, WDS J00328+2817A

Database references
SIMBAD	A
- B

HD 2942 is a triple star system in the constellation Andromeda located approximately 170 parsecs (550 ly) away.

The primary component, a red giant of spectral type K0III, has an apparent magnitude of 6.33, meaning that it is barely visible with the naked eye under good conditions.

The secondary component is much fainter, with an apparent magnitude 11.26, and is located 8.6 arcseconds away. It is a double-lined spectroscopic binary, where two very similar G-type main sequence stars of spectral types G6V and G8V orbit around their common center of mass in 7.489 days. The pair complete an orbit around the primary star every 24,762 years.

Catalogues of stellar multiplicity, like the Washington Double Star Catalog, usually list another component; this star, however, is located much more far away than the other two.
