= HD 221776 =

Double star in the constellation of Andromeda

Observation data Epoch J2000 Equinox ICRS
- Constellation: Andromeda
- Right ascension: 23^{h} 34^{m} 46.7420^{s}
- Declination: +38° 01′ 26.402″
- Apparent magnitude (V): 6.18

Characteristics
- Spectral type: K5III
- U−B color index: +1.97
- B−V color index: +1.586

Astrometry
Radial velocity (R_{v})	−13.74±0.11 km/s
Proper motion (μ)	RA: 10.272±0.114 mas/yr Dec.: 11.738±0.106 mas/yr
Parallax (π)	4.0297±0.0838 mas
Distance	810 ± 20 ly (248 ± 5 pc)
Absolute magnitude (M_{V})	−0.68

Details
Mass	1.13 M_{☉}
Radius	49 R_{☉}
Luminosity	591 L_{☉}
Surface gravity (log g)	1.61 cgs
Temperature	4,103 K
Metallicity [Fe/H]	−0.04 dex
Rotational velocity (v sin i)	2.9 km/s

Other designations
- BD+37°4866, HD 221776, HIP 116365, HR 8950, SAO 73351

Database references
SIMBAD	A
- B

HD 221776 is a double star in the northern constellation of Andromeda. With an apparent visual magnitude of 6.18, it is viewable by the naked eye user very favourable conditions. The most luminous component has a spectral classification K5III, meaning that it is an orange giant star that has evolved off the main sequence. An infrared excess has been detected around this star, indicating the star is associated with a cloud of dust particles.

There is a magnitude 11.8 companion at angular separation of 19.8″ along a position angle of 329°, as of 2002; however, its distance measured by parallax yields a much greater distance than the primary star.
