= HD 14622 =

Star in the constellation Andromeda

Observation data Epoch J2000 Equinox J2000
- Constellation: Andromeda
- Right ascension: 02^{h} 22^{m} 50.30342^{s}
- Declination: +41° 23′ 46.6575″
- Apparent magnitude (V): 5.81

Characteristics
- Evolutionary stage: main sequence
- Spectral type: F0 III–IV
- B−V color index: 0.289±0.006
- Variable type: suspected

Astrometry
Radial velocity (R_{v})	−34.5±2.9 km/s
Proper motion (μ)	RA: +75.147 mas/yr Dec.: −98.755 mas/yr
Parallax (π)	20.6905±0.0612 mas
Distance	157.6 ± 0.5 ly (48.3 ± 0.1 pc)
Absolute magnitude (M_{V})	2.45

Details
Mass	1.69 M_{☉}
Radius	1.8 R_{☉}
Luminosity	8.4 L_{☉}
Surface gravity (log g)	4.12 cgs
Temperature	7,241 K
Rotational velocity (v sin i)	43±2 km/s
Age	890 Myr

Other designations
- BD+40°500, FK5 2161, HD 14622, HIP 11090, HR 687, SAO 37986, WDS J02228+4124A

Database references
SIMBAD	data

HD 14622 is a single star in the northern constellation of Andromeda. It is dimly visible to the naked eye under good seeing conditions, having an apparent visual magnitude of 5.81. Based upon an annual parallax shift of 20.7 mas, it is located 158 light years away. The star is moving closer to the Earth with a heliocentric radial velocity of −35 km/s, and is predicted to come within 96 light-years in around 812,000 years.

The stellar classification of HD 14622 is F0 III–IV, showing a mixed spectrum of an evolving subgiant and giant star; suggesting this is an intermediate-mass star that has used up its core hydrogen and evolved away from the main sequence. However, evolutionary models show it is still on the main sequence. The star is suspected of being slightly variable, but this has not been conclusively proven. It is around 890 million years old with 1.69 times the mass of the Sun. The star is radiating 8.4 times the Sun's luminosity from its photosphere at an effective temperature of approximately 7,241.
