= HD 223229 =

Suspected variable star in the constellation Andromeda

Observation data Epoch J2000 Equinox ICRS
- Constellation: Andromeda
- Right ascension: 23^{h} 47^{m} 33.04919^{s}
- Declination: +46° 49′ 57.2217″
- Apparent magnitude (V): 6.07

Characteristics
- Spectral type: B3IV
- U−B color index: −0.66
- B−V color index: −0.14

Astrometry
Radial velocity (R_{v})	−9.3±2.2 km/s
Proper motion (μ)	RA: 0.708±0.059 mas/yr Dec.: −5.845±0.050 mas/yr
Parallax (π)	1.9698±0.0761 mas
Distance	1,660 ± 60 ly (510 ± 20 pc)
Absolute magnitude (M_{V})	−1.36

Details
Mass	6.31±0.49 M_{☉}
Luminosity (bolometric)	1,762 L_{☉}
Temperature	17,900 K
Rotational velocity (v sin i)	30 km/s
Age	36.8±3.0 Myr

Other designations
- BD+46°416, HD 223229, HIP 117340, HR 9011, SAO 53374

Database references
SIMBAD	data

HD 223229 is a suspected variable star in the northern constellation of Andromeda. It is a double star consisting of a magnitude 6.11 primary and a magnitude 8.73 companion. The pair have an angular separation of 0.80″ along a position angle of 250°, as of 2009. The primary is a B-type subgiant star with a stellar classification of B3IV. It has an estimated 6.3 times the mass of the Sun, with an effective temperature of 17,900 K.
