= 26 Andromedae =

Star in the constellation Andromeda

- Location of 26 Andromedae (circled)

Observation data Epoch J2000 Equinox ICRS
- Constellation: Andromeda
- A
- Right ascension: 00^{h} 18^{m} 42.16888^{s}
- Declination: +43° 47′ 28.1082″
- Apparent magnitude (V): 6.11
- B
- Right ascension: 00^{h} 18^{m} 41.66160^{s}
- Declination: +43° 47′ 24.9776″
- Apparent magnitude (V): 9.70

Characteristics
- Evolutionary stage: main sequence
- Spectral type: B8 V + F3 V
- B−V color index: −0.074±0.004
- Variable type: suspected

Astrometry

A
| Radial velocity (R_{v}) | +3.3 km/s |
| Proper motion (μ) | RA: 23.328 mas/yr Dec.: −2.755 mas/yr |
| Parallax (π) | 5.3927±0.0192 mas |
| Distance | 605 ± 2 ly (185.4 ± 0.7 pc) |
| Absolute magnitude (M_{V}) | 0.02 |

B
| Proper motion (μ) | RA: 22.083 mas/yr Dec.: −3.568 mas/yr |
| Parallax (π) | 5.4683±0.0142 mas |
| Distance | 596 ± 2 ly (182.9 ± 0.5 pc) |
| Absolute magnitude (M_{V}) | 4.00 |

Details

A
| Mass | 3.54±0.12 M_{☉} |
| Radius | 3.76 R_{☉} |
| Luminosity | 219 L_{☉} |
| Surface gravity (log g) | 3.82 cgs |
| Temperature | 11,939 K |
| Rotational velocity (v sin i) | 18 km/s |
| Age | 95 Myr |

B
| Mass | 1.04 M_{☉} |
| Radius | 1.165 R_{☉} |
| Luminosity | 1.511 L_{☉} |
| Surface gravity (log g) | 4.322 cgs |
| Temperature | 5,924 K |
| Age | 6.1 Gyr |

Other designations
- 26 And, BD+42°48, HD 1438, HIP 1501, HR 70, SAO 36256, PPM 42805, WDS J00187+4347

Database references
| SIMBAD | data |

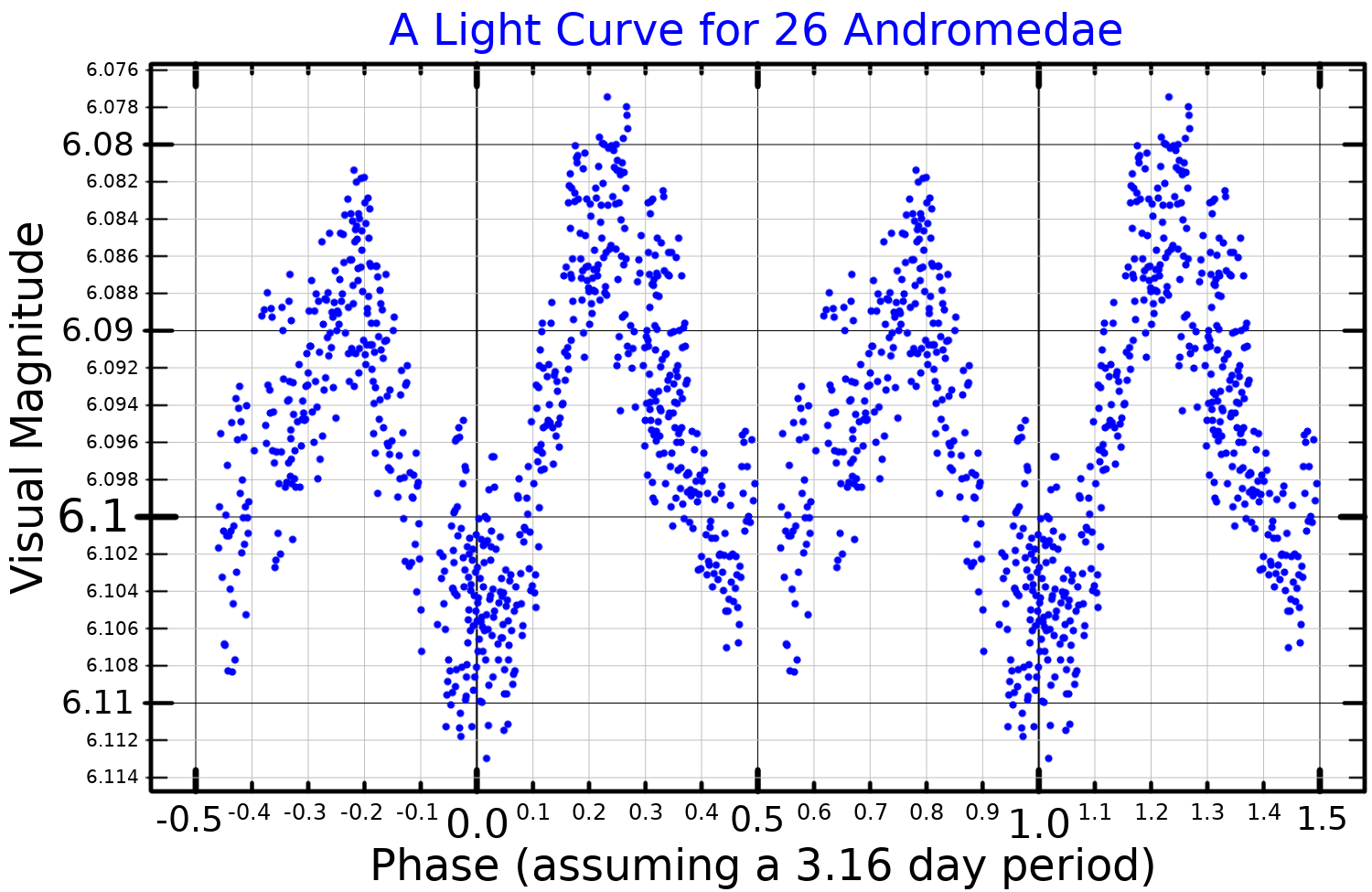
A visual band light curve for 26 Andromedae, adapted from Zasche and Svoboda (2008)

26 Andromedae, abbreviated 26 And, is a binary star system in the constellation Andromeda. 26 Andromedae is the Flamsteed designation. It has a combined apparent visual magnitude of 6.10, which is near the lower limit of visibility to the naked eye. The distance to this system can be estimated from its annual parallax shift of 5.35 mas, which yields a distance of about 600 light years. At that distance, the visual magnitude of the stars is diminished from an extinction of 0.04 due to interstellar dust. The system is moving further from the Earth with a heliocentric radial velocity of +3.3 km/s.

The magnitude 6.11 primary, component A, is a B-type main-sequence star with a stellar classification of B8 V. The star has 3.54 times the mass of the Sun and 3.76 times the Sun's radius. It is around 95 million years old and is spinning with a projected rotational velocity of 18 km/s. 26 And is radiating 219 times the Sun's luminosity from its photosphere at an effective temperature of 11,939 K. It displays an infrared excess that suggests a circumstellar debris disk orbiting at a distance of 169.3 AU from the star with a temperature of 75 K.

The fainter secondary, component B, is a magnitude 9.70 star located 6.2″ from the primary. It is an F-type main-sequence star with a class of F3 V that shows an unexplained long term variability.

One of the components of this system displays a slight photometric variation with a period of 3.16 days. This may be caused by pulsation or an ellipsoidal variation. This system's X-ray emission hasn't been detected yet, with an upper limit of L_{x} < 29.79 erg/s.
