= HD 16028 =

Orange giant star in the constellation Andromeda

Observation data Epoch J2000 Equinox ICRS
- Constellation: Andromeda
- Right ascension: 02^{h} 35^{m} 38.7415^{s}
- Declination: +37° 18′ 44.143″
- Apparent magnitude (V): 5.71

Characteristics
- Spectral type: K3III
- B−V color index: 1.41

Astrometry
Radial velocity (R_{v})	−5.48±0.20 km/s
Proper motion (μ)	RA: −1.454±0.217 mas/yr Dec.: −13.822±0.177 mas/yr
Parallax (π)	4.4409±0.1180 mas
Distance	730 ± 20 ly (225 ± 6 pc)

Details
Radius	37 R_{☉}
Luminosity	427 L_{☉}
Surface gravity (log g)	1.10 cgs
Temperature	4,345 K
Metallicity [Fe/H]	−0.54 dex

Other designations
- BD+36°519, SAO 55684, HIP 12072, HR 748

Database references
SIMBAD	data

HD 16028 is a star in the constellation Andromeda. Its apparent magnitude is 5.71. Located approximately 225 parsecs (730 ly) distant, it is an orange giant of spectral type K3III, a star that has used up its core hydrogen and has expanded.

Double star catalogues list two stars as optical companions. One has a magnitude of 10.9 and is separated by 16.9 arcseconds. It has been suggested it is related to the primary, but parallax measured by Gaia yields a much greater distance for this star in comparison to HD 16028. The other is even fainter and is separated 45 arcseconds from the primary.
