= HD 222109 =

Binary star system in the constellation Andromeda

Observation data Epoch J2000 Equinox ICRS
- Constellation: Andromeda
- Right ascension: 23^{h} 37^{m} 32.04280^{s}
- Declination: +44° 25′ 44.3723″
- Apparent magnitude (V): 5.80 (6.08 + 7.38)

Characteristics
- Spectral type: B8V
- U−B color index: −0.32
- B−V color index: −0.06

Astrometry
Radial velocity (R_{v})	−22.90±3.9 km/s
Proper motion (μ)	RA: 14.20±0.30 mas/yr Dec.: −17.63±0.45 mas/yr
Parallax (π)	4.04±0.52 mas
Distance	approx. 800 ly (approx. 250 pc)
Absolute magnitude (M_{V})	−1.12

Orbit
Period (P)	351.22 yr
Semi-major axis (a)	0.41″
Eccentricity (e)	0.39
Inclination (i)	40.3°
Longitude of the node (Ω)	157.1°
Periastron epoch (T)	B 2103.29
Argument of periastron (ω) (secondary)	0.0°

Details
Mass	2.9 M_{☉}
Surface gravity (log g)	3.932±0.021 cgs
Temperature	12,157±100 K
Rotational velocity (v sin i)	158±13 km/s
Age	54 Myr

Other designations
- BD+43°4508, HD 222109, HIP 116582, HR 8962, SAO 53202

Database references
SIMBAD	data

HD 222109 is a binary star system located in the northern constellation of Andromeda. It has a combined apparent visual magnitude of 5.80, which allows it to be visible to the naked eye as a single star. The system has a combined spectral classification of B8V. It is situated at a distance of approximately 800 light years from the Solar System, and the two stars orbit each other with a period of 351.22 years. They are separated by a distance of 0.41″ and have an orbital eccentricity of 0.39. Individually, the stars have apparent magnitudes of 6.08 and 7.38, respectively.
