= HD 2767 =

Double star in the constellation Andromeda

Observation data Epoch J2000 Equinox ICRS
- Constellation: Andromeda
- Right ascension: 00^{h} 31^{m} 25.6379^{s}
- Declination: +33° 34′ 53.892″
- Apparent magnitude (V): 5.88

Characteristics
- Evolutionary stage: red giant branch
- Spectral type: K1III
- B−V color index: 1.13

Astrometry
Radial velocity (R_{v})	3.398±0.114 km/s
Proper motion (μ)	RA: 50.788±0.049 mas/yr Dec.: −10.707±0.034 mas/yr
Parallax (π)	8.5954±0.0582 mas
Distance	379 ± 3 ly (116.3 ± 0.8 pc)
Absolute magnitude (M_{V})	+0.56

Details
Mass	2.86 M_{☉}
Radius	14.7 R_{☉}
Luminosity	51 L_{☉}
Surface gravity (log g)	2.54 cgs
Temperature	4,023 K
Age	376 Myr

Other designations
- HIP 2475, HR 122, BD+32°80, SAO 53956

Database references
SIMBAD	data

HD 2767 is the primary component of a double star located 116 parsecs (379 ly) away in the constellation Andromeda. It is a red giant with a spectral type of K1III and an apparent magnitude of 5.88, thus is visible by the naked eye under favourable conditions.

The secondary is named BD+32 81, has an apparent magnitude of 9.28, and is an F-type star; it shares radial velocity, parallax and proper motion with the primary component. The distance from the primary is estimated as 6,536 AU, while their separation in the sky is 56 arcseconds.
