= HD 222399 =

Double star in the constellation Andromeda

Observation data Epoch J2000 Equinox ICRS
- Constellation: Andromeda
- A
- Right ascension: 23^{h} 40^{m} 02.8168^{s}
- Declination: +37° 39′ 09.508″
- Apparent magnitude (V): 6.51
- A
- Right ascension: 23^{h} 40^{m} 03.1960^{s}
- Declination: +37° 38′ 55.218″
- Apparent magnitude (V): 10.57

Characteristics
- Evolutionary stage: main sequence
- Spectral type: F2IV
- U−B color index: +0.10
- B−V color index: +0.35

Astrometry

A
Radial velocity (R_{v})	−19.73±0.17 km/s
Proper motion (μ)	RA: −8.669 mas/yr Dec.: −81.166 mas/yr
Parallax (π)	10.8719±0.0178 mas
Distance	300.0 ± 0.5 ly (92.0 ± 0.2 pc)
Absolute magnitude (M_{V})	+1.70

B
Radial velocity (R_{v})	−19.59±0.19 km/s
Proper motion (μ)	RA: −6.695 mas/yr Dec.: −83.249 mas/yr
Parallax (π)	10.9323±0.0127 mas
Distance	298.3 ± 0.3 ly (91.5 ± 0.1 pc)

Details

A
Mass	1.77 M_{☉}
Radius	1.52 R_{☉}
Luminosity	17 L_{☉}
Surface gravity (log g)	3.78 cgs
Temperature	6,939 K
Metallicity [Fe/H]	−0.04 dex
Rotational velocity (v sin i)	55 km/s
Age	1.4 Gyr

B
Mass	0.80 M_{☉}
Radius	0.82 R_{☉}
Luminosity	0.35 L_{☉}
Surface gravity (log g)	4.51 cgs
Temperature	4,888 K
Metallicity [Fe/H]	0.10 dex
Age	1.2 Gyr

Other designations
- BD+36°5098, HD 222399, HIP 116781, HR 8973, SAO 73422

Database references
SIMBAD	A
- B

HD 222399 is a double star in the northern constellation of Andromeda. The magnitude 6.5 primary is an F-type subgiant star with a stellar classification of F2IV. It has a magnitude 10.57 companion at an angular separation of 14.7″ along a position angle of 162° (as of 2002).
