= HD 224635 and HD 224636 =

Binary star system in the constellation Andromeda

HD 224635/HD 224636
Observation data Epoch J2000 Equinox ICRS
- Constellation: Andromeda
- HD 224635
- Right ascension: 23^{h} 59^{m} 29.2915^{s}
- Declination: +33° 43′ 25.8773″
- Apparent magnitude (V): 6.46
- HD 224636
- Right ascension: 23^{h} 59^{m} 29.2054^{s}
- Declination: +33° 43′ 27.6539″
- Apparent magnitude (V): 6.72

Characteristics

HD 224635
- Evolutionary stage: main sequence
- Spectral type: F8
- B−V color index: 0.51

HD 224636
- Evolutionary stage: main sequence
- Spectral type: G1
- B−V color index: 0.55

Astrometry
Radial velocity (R_{v})	−7.90±0.2 km/s
Proper motion (μ)	RA: −59.68±0.65 mas/yr Dec.: −113.19±0.35 mas/yr
Parallax (π)	34.57±0.51 mas
Distance	94 ± 1 ly (28.9 ± 0.4 pc)
Absolute magnitude (M_{V})	+3.5

Orbit
Period (P)	1,224±320 yr
Semi-major axis (a)	5.048±0.849″
Eccentricity (e)	0.449±0.066
Inclination (i)	58.9±1.0°
Longitude of the node (Ω)	4.8±1.4°
Periastron epoch (T)	1973±12
Argument of periastron (ω) (secondary)	282±10°

Details

HD 224635
Mass	1.19 M_{☉}
Radius	1.20 R_{☉}
Luminosity	1.90 L_{☉}
Surface gravity (log g)	4.36 cgs
Temperature	6,191 K
Metallicity	−0.070
Age	1.42 Gyr

HD 224636
Mass	1.13 M_{☉}
Radius	1.15 R_{☉}
Luminosity	1.58 L_{☉}
Surface gravity (log g)	4.36 cgs
Temperature	6,023 K
Metallicity	−0.070
Age	1.46 Gyr

Other designations
- BD+32 4747, HIP 118281, SAO 73656, ADS 17149, WDS J23595+3343
- HD 224635: HR 9074
- HD 224636: HR 9075

Database references
SIMBAD	HD 224635
- HD 224636

HD 224635 and HD 224636 is a pair of stars comprising a binary star system in the constellation Andromeda. They are located approximately 94 light years away and they orbit each other every 1,200 years.

The primary star is HD 224635, a magnitude 6.46 star (making it visible by the naked eye under very favourable conditions) with a spectral type F8 that is 1.19 times more massive than the Sun.

The secondary star is the slightly fainter HD 224636, with an apparent visual magnitude of 6.72, a spectral type G1, and 1.13 times more massive than the Sun.
