= HD 7853 =

Double star in the constellation Andromeda

Observation data Epoch J2000 Equinox J2000
- Constellation: Andromeda
- Right ascension: 01^{h} 18^{m} 47.0097^{s}
- Declination: +37° 23′ 10.592″
- Apparent magnitude (V): 6.497

Characteristics
- Evolutionary stage: main sequence + main sequence
- Spectral type: kA5hF1mF2
- B−V color index: 0.217

Astrometry
Radial velocity (R_{v})	5.0±2.90 km/s
Proper motion (μ)	RA: −8.659±0.107 mas/yr Dec.: −3.016±0.120 mas/yr
Parallax (π)	7.78±0.70 mas
Distance	420 ± 40 ly (130 ± 10 pc)
Absolute magnitude (M_{V})	+0.92

Details

A
Mass	2.3 M_{☉}
Radius	3.5 R_{☉}
Luminosity	41 L_{☉}
Surface gravity (log g)	3.66 cgs
Temperature	7,869 K
Age	722 Myr

B
Mass	1.2 M_{☉}
Radius	1.3 R_{☉}
Luminosity	2.2 L_{☉}
Surface gravity (log g)	4.18 cgs
Temperature	6,155 K
Age	3.8 Gyr

Other designations
- HR 379, BD+36 220, SAO 54592, HIP 6140, WDS J01188+3724, ADS 1055

Database references
SIMBAD	A
- B

HD 7853 is a double star in the constellation Andromeda. With an apparent magnitude of 6.46, it can barely be seen with the naked eye even on the best of nights. The system is located approximately 130 parsecs (420 ly) distant, and the brighter star is an Am star, meaning that it has unusual metallic absorption lines. The spectral classification of kA5hF1mF2 means that it would have a spectral class of A5 if it were based solely on the calcium K line, F2 if based on the lines of other metals, and F1 if based on the hydrogen absorption lines. The two components are six arc-seconds apart and the secondary is three magnitudes fainter than the primary.
