= HR 178 =

Likely binary star in the constellation Andromeda

Observation data Epoch J2000 Equinox J2000
- Constellation: Andromeda
- Right ascension: 00^{h} 41^{m} 36.037^{s}
- Declination: +24° 37′ 44.43″
- Apparent magnitude (V): 6.046

Characteristics
- Evolutionary stage: main sequence
- Spectral type: kA5hF1mF2
- B−V color index: 0.287
- Variable type: suspected

Astrometry
Radial velocity (R_{v})	−15.60±0.9 km/s
Proper motion (μ)	RA: 106.272±0.499 mas/yr Dec.: −12.324±0.306 mas/yr
Parallax (π)	8.0963±0.2630 mas
Distance	400 ± 10 ly (124 ± 4 pc)
Absolute magnitude (M_{V})	+0.55

Orbit
Period (P)	21.26 yr
Semi-major axis (a)	0.126″
Eccentricity (e)	0.5

Details
Mass	2.44 M_{☉}
Radius	3.82 R_{☉}
Luminosity	45 L_{☉}
Surface gravity (log g)	3.80±0.14 cgs
Temperature	7800±200 K
Metallicity [Fe/H]	0.53±0.13 dex
Rotational velocity (v sin i)	18 km/s
Age	1.1 Gyr

Other designations
- HIP 3269, HD 3883, BD+23°94, SAO 74200

Database references
SIMBAD	data

HR 178 is a probable binary star in the constellation Andromeda. Located approximately 124 parsecs (400 ly) distant, it is an evolved Am star with a combined apparent magnitude of 6.06, meaning that it can only be seen with the naked eye on dark, clear nights. The star is suspected of variability, possibly varying between magnitudes 6.04 and 6.06. The variable magnitude period of HD 3883 is about 9.17 min.

The spectrum of HR 178 has been extensively studied for establishing element abundances in the evolved Am stars. It is given a spectral class of kA5hF1mF2, meaning its spectral type is A5, F1, or F2, depending on the particular spectral lines examined. It is very close to the end of its main sequence evolution and the margin of error in its mass is only about 0.1 M_{☉}.

HR 178 has been suspected of being a binary star since 1938 when its spectrum was interpreted as being composite. The pair were resolved using speckle interferometry in 1983. The companion is modelled to be between 1.5 and 3 magnitudes fainter than the primary star. Although there have since been several failed attempts to resolve the pair, a tentative orbit has been calculated with a period of 21.26 years and an eccentricity of 0.5.
