= HD 1606 =

Star in the constellation Andromeda

Observation data Epoch J2000 Equinox ICRS
- Constellation: Andromeda
- Right ascension: 00^{h} 20^{m} 24.40107^{s}
- Declination: +30° 56′ 08.2099″
- Apparent magnitude (V): 5.869

Characteristics
- Evolutionary stage: main sequence
- Spectral type: B7V
- U−B color index: −0.45
- B−V color index: −0.10
- Variable type: Suspected

Astrometry
Radial velocity (R_{v})	3.8 km/s
Proper motion (μ)	RA: 15.734±0.159 mas/yr Dec.: −2.957±0.125 mas/yr
Parallax (π)	5.5900±0.1069 mas
Distance	580 ± 10 ly (179 ± 3 pc)
Absolute magnitude (M_{V})	−0.5

Details
Mass	3.75±0.08 M_{☉}
Radius	2.9 R_{☉}
Luminosity	245+36 −31 L_{☉}
Surface gravity (log g)	3.988±0.017 cgs
Temperature	13,186±100 K
Rotational velocity (v sin i)	113±8 km/s
Age	211 Myr

Other designations
- NSV 128, AG+30°32, BD+30°42, GC 408, HD 1606, HIP 1630, HR 78, SAO 53820, PPM 65213

Database references
SIMBAD	data

HD 1606 is a single star in the northern constellation of Andromeda, positioned a few degrees to the northeast of the bright star Alpheratz. It has a blue-white hue and is dimly visible to the naked eye with an apparent visual magnitude of 5.87. Although it is suspected of variability, none has been conclusively found. The star is located at a distance of approximately 580 light-years (179 parsecs) from the Sun based on parallax, and is drifting further away with a radial velocity of +4 km/s. It has an absolute magnitude of −0.5.

This is a B-type main-sequence star with a stellar classification of B7V, which means it is currently generating energy through hydrogen fusion at its core. It has 3.75 times the mass of the Sun and a fairly high rate of spin, showing a projected rotational velocity of 113 km/s. The star is radiating 245 times the luminosity of the Sun from its photosphere at an effective temperature of 13,186 K.
