= HD 224801 =

Alpha^{2} Canum Venaticorum variable star in the constellation of Andromeda

- Location of HD 224801 (circled in red)

Observation data Epoch J2000 Equinox ICRS
- Constellation: Andromeda
- Right ascension: 00^{h} 00^{m} 43.6345^{s}
- Declination: +45° 15′ 12.007″
- Apparent magnitude (V): 6.32 – 6.42

Characteristics
- Evolutionary stage: main sequence
- Spectral type: A0IIspSiSrHg
- Apparent magnitude (B): 6.299
- Apparent magnitude (V): 6.347
- Apparent magnitude (G): 6.333
- Apparent magnitude (J): 6.407
- Apparent magnitude (H): 6.506
- Apparent magnitude (K): 6.511
- U−B color index: −0.35
- B−V color index: −0.0425
- Variable type: Alpha² CVn

Astrometry
Radial velocity (R_{v})	−1.00±2.2 km/s
Proper motion (μ)	RA: +17.745 mas/yr Dec.: +0.607 mas/yr
Parallax (π)	5.5784±0.0405 mas
Distance	585 ± 4 ly (179 ± 1 pc)
Absolute magnitude (M_{V})	0.0

Details
Mass	3.4 M_{☉}
Radius	2.8 R_{☉}
Luminosity	170 L_{☉}
Surface gravity (log g)	4.12 cgs
Temperature	11,900 K
Metallicity [Fe/H]	0.98 dex
Rotation	3.74 days
Rotational velocity (v sin i)	30 km/s
Age	239 Myr

Other designations
- CG Andromedae, BD+44° 4538, HD 224801, HIP 63, HR 9080, SAO 53568, PPM 42458, TYC 3246-2388-1.

Database references
SIMBAD	data

HD 224801, also known as CG Andromedae, is an Alpha^{2} Canum Venaticorum variable star in the constellation Andromeda. Located approximately 188 parsecs (610 ly) away, the star varies between apparent magnitudes 6.32 and 6.42 over a period of approximately 3.74 days.

== Spectrum ==
CG Andromedae is also a chemically peculiar star with a strong magnetic field, or Ap star, with a spectral type A0IIspSiSrHg. This means that it's a bright giant star that shows narrow absorption lines and unusual strong lines of silicon, strontium and mercury. Calcium and manganese lines are weaker than expected instead. Other sources report that the stronger lines are of silicon and europium, thus giving a spectral classification B9pSiEu, which has just a slightly different temperature for the blackbody emission in addition to the different lines.

== Variability ==
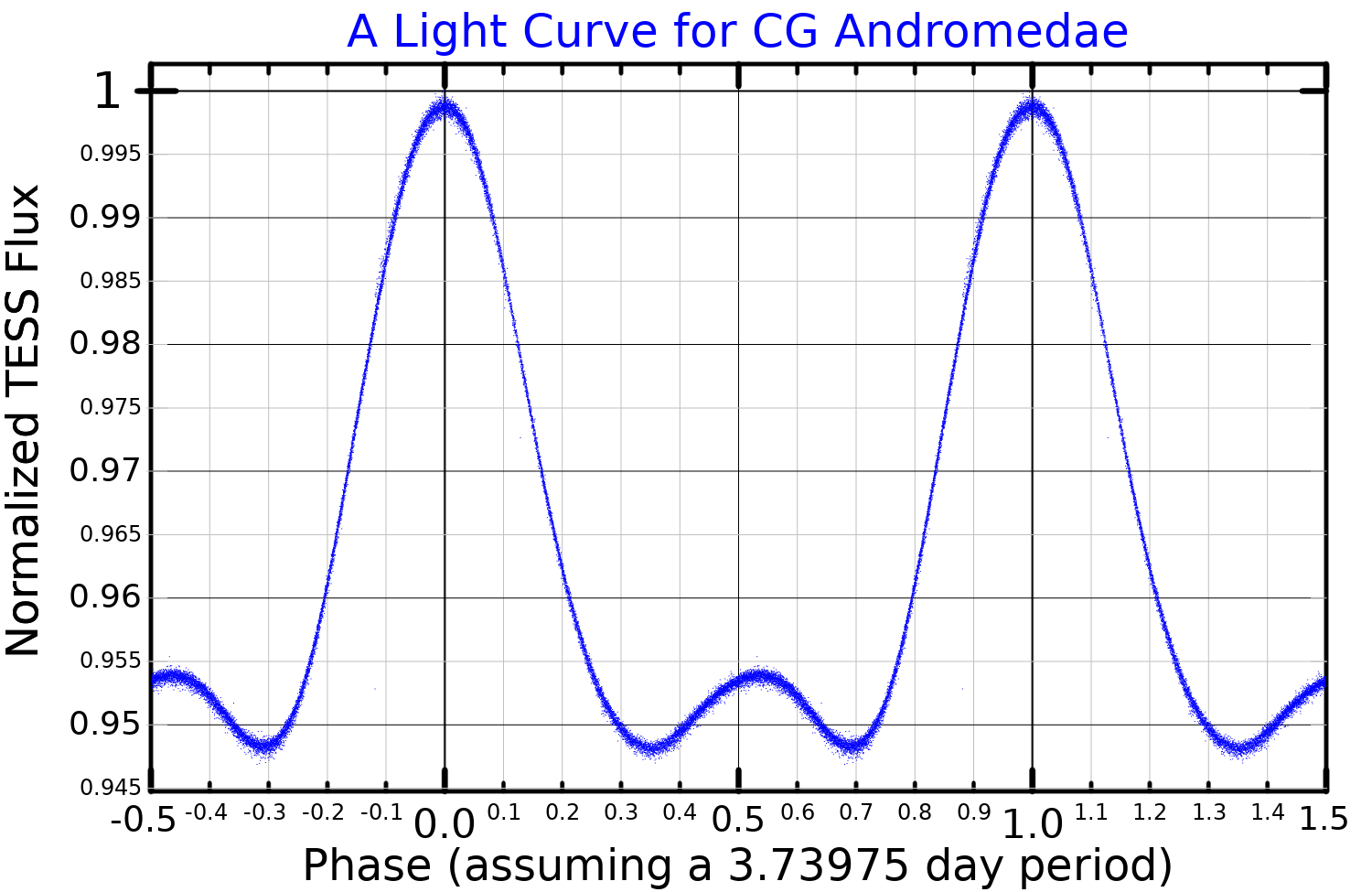
A light curve for CG Andromedae (HD 224801), plotted from TESS data

CG Andromedae's variability was detected in 1951, and announced by Sanford S. Provin in 1953.

Like in Alpha^{2} Canum Venaticorum variable stars, CG Andromedae shows a variation of luminosity and one in the strength of spectral lines with the same period of approximately 3.74 days. It is thought that this is caused by an inhomogeneous distribution of elements on the surface of the star, which cause an inhomogeneous surface brightness.

A shorter period, slightly longer than 2 hours, with an amplitude of 0.011 magnitudes has been observed in the light curve of CG Andromedae; however, with a temperature of 11,000 K, it lies outside the instability strip of the HR diagram where rapidly oscillating Ap stars are located. Magnetohydrodynamic waves propagating in the star could explain the observed variability.
