= HD 16004 =

Cmeically peculiar B-type star in the constellation Andromeda

Observation data Epoch J2000 Equinox ICRS
- Constellation: Andromeda
- Right ascension: 02^{h} 35^{m} 27.90126^{s}
- Declination: +39° 39′ 51.7705″
- Apparent magnitude (V): 6.26

Characteristics
- Spectral type: B9.5 III HgMn
- U−B color index: −0.33
- B−V color index: −0.30

Astrometry
Radial velocity (R_{v})	−6.8±1.1 km/s
Proper motion (μ)	RA: +16.659 mas/yr Dec.: −34.296 mas/yr
Parallax (π)	4.9384±0.1650 mas
Distance	660 ± 20 ly (202 ± 7 pc)
Absolute magnitude (M_{V})	−0.36

Details
Mass	2.88 M_{☉}
Radius	3.274 R_{☉}
Luminosity	158 L_{☉}
Surface gravity (log g)	3.8 cgs
Temperature	10,809 K
Metallicity [Fe/H]	−0.17 dex
Rotational velocity (v sin i)	30 km/s
Age	162 Myr

Other designations
- BD+39°573, GC 3093, HD 16004, HIP 12057, HR 746, SAO 55680, WDS J02355+3940A

Database references
SIMBAD	data

HD 16004 is blue-white hued star in the northern constellation of Andromeda. It is a challenge to see with the naked eye even under good viewing conditions, having an apparent visual magnitude of 6.26. Located approximately 660 light-years (202 parsecs) away from the Sun based on parallax, it is drifting closer with a heliocentric radial velocity of −7 km/s.

This is a chemically peculiar mercury-manganese star with a stellar classification of B9.5 III HgMn. It is an estimated 162 million years old and is spinning with a projected rotational velocity of 30 km/s. The star is radiating 158 times the luminosity of the Sun from its photosphere at an effective temperature of 10,809 K.
