= HD 1185 =

Binary star in the constellation Andromeda

Observation data Epoch J2000 Equinox ICRS
- Constellation: Andromeda
- A
- Right ascension: 00^{h} 16^{m} 21.52890^{s}
- Declination: +43° 35′ 42.1834″
- Apparent magnitude (V): 6.150
- B
- Right ascension: 00^{h} 16^{m} 22.33562^{s}
- Declination: +43° 35′ 44.5452″
- Apparent magnitude (V): 9.76

Characteristics

A
- Evolutionary stage: main sequence
- Spectral type: A2VpSi
- U−B color index: 0.03
- B−V color index: 0.05

Astrometry

A
Radial velocity (R_{v})	3.00±2.60 km/s
Proper motion (μ)	RA: +35.421 mas/yr Dec.: −23.037 mas/yr
Parallax (π)	10.2349±0.0329 mas
Distance	319 ± 1 ly (97.7 ± 0.3 pc)

B
Radial velocity (R_{v})	4.48±0.22 km/s
Proper motion (μ)	RA: +34.310 mas/yr Dec.: −21.927 mas/yr
Parallax (π)	10.1971±0.0157 mas
Distance	319.9 ± 0.5 ly (98.1 ± 0.2 pc)

Details

A
Mass	2.4 M_{☉}
Radius	2.1 R_{☉}
Luminosity	38 L_{☉}
Surface gravity (log g)	4.02 cgs
Temperature	9,103 K
Metallicity [Fe/H]	−0.11 dex
Rotational velocity (v sin i)	128 km/s
Age	311 Myr

B
Mass	1.0 M_{☉}
Radius	0.90 R_{☉}
Luminosity	0.76 L_{☉}
Surface gravity (log g)	4.50 cgs
Temperature	5,712 K
Metallicity [Fe/H]	−0.26 dex
Age	224 Myr

Other designations
- BD+42°41, HD 1185, HIP 1302, HR 56, SAO 36221, WDS 00164+4336

Database references
SIMBAD	data

HD 1185 is a double star in the northern constellation of Andromeda. The primary, with an apparent magnitude of 6.15, is a white main-sequence star of spectral type A2VpSi, indicating it has stronger silicon absorption lines than usual, thus making it also an Ap star. The secondary companion, which is 9.08 arcseconds away, is not visible to the naked eye at an apparent magnitude of 9.76. It shares common proper motion and parallax with the primary star but orbital parameters are still unknown.
