= HD 6114 =

Binary star system in the constellation Andromeda

Observation data Epoch J2000.0 Equinox ICRS
- Constellation: Andromeda
- HD 6114 A
- Right ascension: 01^{h} 03^{m} 01.54722^{s}
- Declination: +47° 22′ 34.1796″
- Apparent magnitude (V): 6.76
- HD 6114 B
- Right ascension: 01^{h} 03^{m} 01.55854^{s}
- Declination: +47° 22′ 33.0207″
- Apparent magnitude (V): 8.07

Characteristics
- Spectral type: A9 V
- Apparent magnitude (V): 6.46
- B−V color index: 0.248±0.012

Astrometry

HD 6114 A
Radial velocity (R_{v})	+2.4±2.8 km/s
Proper motion (μ)	RA: 87.411±0.040 mas/yr Dec.: −15.153±0.024 mas/yr
Parallax (π)	9.2058±0.0392 mas
Distance	354 ± 2 ly (108.6 ± 0.5 pc)
Absolute magnitude (M_{V})	1.56

HD 6114 B
Proper motion (μ)	RA: 87.190±0.103 mas/yr Dec.: −23.426±0.042 mas/yr
Parallax (π)	9.4797±0.0651 mas
Distance	344 ± 2 ly (105.5 ± 0.7 pc)

Orbit
Period (P)	450 yr
Semi-major axis (a)	0.816″
Eccentricity (e)	0.80
Inclination (i)	87.0°
Longitude of the node (Ω)	176.7°
Periastron epoch (T)	1902.0
Argument of periastron (ω) (secondary)	180°

Details

HD 6114 A
Mass	1.65 M_{☉}
Luminosity	21.2+3.5 −3.0 L_{☉}
Surface gravity (log g)	4.03±0.14 cgs
Temperature	7,611±259 K
Rotational velocity (v sin i)	149 km/s
Age	863 Myr

Other designations
- BD+46°243, HD 6114, HIP 4911, HR 289, SAO 36875, ADS 862, WDS J01030+4723

Database references
SIMBAD	data

HD 6114 is a visual binary star system in the northern constellation of Andromeda. With a combined apparent magnitude of 6.46, the star can only be seen with the naked eye by keen-eyed observers even on the best of nights. Based upon an annual parallax shift of 10.4 mas as seen from Earth's orbit, the system is located approximately 108 parsecs (350 ly) distant.

The binary nature of this system was discovered by O. Struve in 1864. It consists of a magnitude 6.76 primary component with a dimmer magnitude 8.07 secondary. As of 2015 the pair had an angular separation of 1.30″ along a position angle of 175°. The two stars orbit each other with a period of 450 years with an eccentricity of 0.80.

The primary is an A-type main-sequence star with a stellar classification of A9 V. At the estimated age of 863 million years, it is spinning rapidly with a projected rotational velocity of 149 km/s. The star has 1.65 times the mass of the Sun and is radiating 21 times the Sun's luminosity from its photosphere at an effective temperature of 7,611 K.
