= KK Andromedae =

Star in the constellation Andromeda

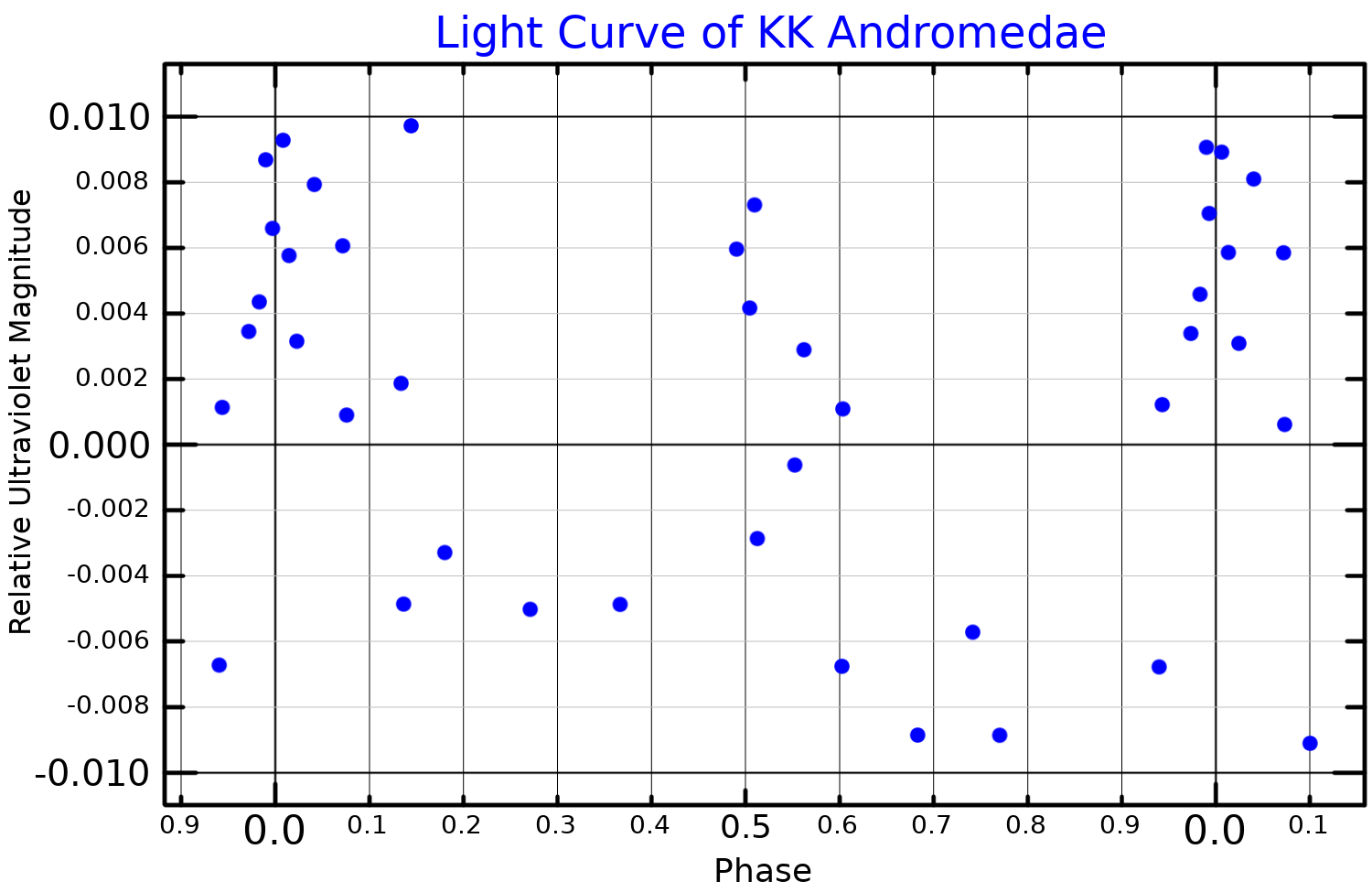
- An ultraviole light curve of KK Andromedae, adapted from Hildebrandt (1975)

Observation data Epoch J2000 Equinox ICRS
- Constellation: Andromeda
- Right ascension: 01^{h} 34^{m} 16.62220^{s}
- Declination: +37° 14′ 13.8765″
- Apparent magnitude (V): 5.90

Characteristics
- Spectral type: B9 IV
- U−B color index: −0.3
- B−V color index: −0.067±0.001
- Variable type: α^{2} CVn

Astrometry
Radial velocity (R_{v})	−1.4±1.8 km/s
Proper motion (μ)	RA: +5.719 mas/yr Dec.: −21.238 mas/yr
Parallax (π)	7.4585±0.1156 mas
Distance	437 ± 7 ly (134 ± 2 pc)
Absolute magnitude (M_{V})	+0.35

Details
Mass	3.07±0.06 M_{☉}
Radius	2.7±0.4 R_{☉}
Luminosity	91 L_{☉}
Surface gravity (log g)	3.914±0.020 cgs
Temperature	11,729±50 K
Rotation	0.67 days
Rotational velocity (v sin i)	163±10 km/s
Age	225 Myr

Other designations
- KK And, BD+36° 277, HD 9531, HIP 7321, HR 446, SAO 54788, PPM 66400

Database references
SIMBAD	data

KK Andromedae, also known as HD 9531, is a variable star in the northern constellation of Andromeda. It has an apparent visual magnitude of 5.90, which places it near the lower limit of visibility to the naked eye even under good viewing conditions. An Alpha^{2} Canum Venaticorum variable, it varies in brightness by 0.012 magnitude every 0.66 days. Based upon an annual parallax shift of 7.5 mas as seen from Earth, it is located around 437 light years from the Sun. At that distance, the brightness of the star is diminished by an extinction of 0.26 magnitude due to interstellar dust.

Cowley et al. (1969) assigned this star a stellar classification of B9 IV, which would indicate it is a B-type star in the subgiant stage that has exhausted the hydrogen supply at its core and is expanding. It is a catalogued as an Ap star that displays an abnormal silicon abundance, but has been reported to actually be a helium-weak chemically peculiar star. The star has just over three times the mass of the Sun and about 2.7 times the Sun's radius. It is an estimated 225 million years old and is spinning rapidly with a projected rotational velocity of 163 km/s and a rotation period of 16 hours. KK And is radiating 91 times the Sun's luminosity from its photosphere at an effective temperature of 11,729 K.
