= HD 5608 =

Star in the constellation Andromeda

Observation data Epoch J2000.0 Equinox ICRS
- Constellation: Andromeda
- Right ascension: 00^{h} 58^{m} 14.21894^{s}
- Declination: +33° 57′ 03.1841″
- Apparent magnitude (V): +5.98

Characteristics
- Evolutionary stage: Red giant branch
- Spectral type: K0 IV
- B−V color index: 1.016

Astrometry
Radial velocity (R_{v})	−23.13±0.12 km/s
Proper motion (μ)	RA: 36.459 mas/yr Dec.: -71.320 mas/yr
Parallax (π)	17.0697±0.0302 mas
Distance	191.1 ± 0.3 ly (58.6 ± 0.1 pc)
Absolute magnitude (M_{V})	+2.11

Orbit
Period (P)	146+74 −37 yr
Semi-major axis (a)	0.524+0.151 −0.084" (30.7+8.8 −4.9 AU)
Eccentricity (e)	0.53+0.18 −0.26
Inclination (i)	147.5+6.6 −13°
Longitude of the node (Ω)	141+56 −48°
Periastron epoch (T)	2,472,895+17,464 −5,098
Argument of periastron (ω) (secondary)	257+32 −35°

Details

HD 5608 A
Mass	1.731±0.087 M_{☉}
Radius	5.914±0.144 R_{☉}
Luminosity	17.5±1.0 L_{☉}
Surface gravity (log g)	3.134±0.003 cgs
Temperature	4,897±25 K
Metallicity [Fe/H]	+0.12±0.03 dex
Rotational velocity (v sin i)	1.37 km/s
Age	3.0±0.3 Gyr

HD 5608 B
Mass	0.10±0.01 M_{☉}
Mass	121.2+8.3 −7.0 M_{Jup}

Other designations
- BD+33°140, FK5 2061, HD 5608, HIP 4552, HR 275, SAO 54306

Database references
SIMBAD	data

HD 5608 is an orange-hued star in the northern constellation of Andromeda with one known planet, HD 5608 b. It is a dim star near the lower limit of visibility to the naked eye, having an apparent visual magnitude of +5.98. The distance to HD 5608, as estimated from an annual parallax shift of 17.07 mas, is 191 light-years (59 parsecs). It is moving closer to the Earth with a heliocentric radial velocity of −23 km/s, and is expected to make its closest approach in 1.285 million years when it comes to within 124 light-years.

This is a K-type star on the red giant branch track with a stellar classification of K0 IV. It has 1.7 times the mass of the Sun and, at the age of three billion years, has expanded to six times the Sun's radius. It is radiating 17–18 times the Sun's luminosity from its enlarged photosphere at an effective temperature of 4,897 K. It has a higher than solar metallicity – a term astronomers use to describe the abundance of elements other than hydrogen and helium.

HD 5608 has a co-moving companion, HD 5608 B, at an angular separation of 0.6″, which has been directly imaged. The physical separation of the pair is calculated as 40±1 AU or 47±3 AU, depending on the assumptions. It has an H band magnitude difference of 9.40 with the primary and an estimated mass of 0.10 M_{☉}. A second companion at a separation of 7.4″ is a background star. This companion star has since been characterized by radial velocity and astrometry in addition to imaging.

== Planetary companion ==
In 2012, the Okayama Planet Search Program reported the detection of a substellar companion in orbit around HD 5608, based upon Doppler measurements between 2003 and 2011 from the Okayama observatory in Kurashiki. These showed a linear trend indicating the existence of a distant companion. The data showed an additional periodicity of around 766 days. This object shows a minimum mass of 1.4 M_{J}, a semimajor axis of 1.9 AU, and an eccentricity of 0.19. The high eccentricity of this planet could have been induced by the low mass companion star HD 5608 B via the Kozai mechanism.

The HD 5608 A planetary system (Note: Mass: Lin et al. (2024) Orbital period: Teng et al. (2023) Eccentricity: Teng et al. (2023) Semi-major axis:Lin et al. (2024))
Companion (in order from star)	Mass	Semimajor axis (AU)	Orbital period (days)	Eccentricity	Inclination (°)	Radius
b	≥1.421±0.091 M_{J}	1.974±0.035	768.70+4.72 −1.67	0.110+0.029 −0.080	—	—
