= HD 225218 =

Quadruple star system in the constellation of Andromeda

Observation data Epoch J2000.0 Equinox ICRS
- Constellation: Andromeda
- HD 225218 A
- Right ascension: 00^{h} 04^{m} 36.58441^{s}
- Declination: +42° 05′ 33.0865″
- Apparent magnitude (V): 6.16
- HD 225218 B
- Right ascension: 00^{h} 04^{m} 36.67195^{s}
- Declination: +42° 05′ 27.8497″
- Apparent magnitude (V): 9.65

Characteristics

A
- Spectral type: B9III
- U−B color index: 0.14
- B−V color index: 0.15

A
- Evolutionary stage: main sequence
- Spectral type: F0V

Astrometry

HD 225218 A
Radial velocity (R_{v})	−8.0 km/s
Proper motion (μ)	RA: −10.367±0.266 mas/yr Dec.: −14.491±0.222 mas/yr
Parallax (π)	3.0041±0.3539 mas
Distance	approx. 1,100 ly (approx. 330 pc)

HD 225218 B
Proper motion (μ)	RA: −12.314±0.015 mas/yr Dec.: −16.129±0.015 mas/yr
Parallax (π)	4.4324±0.0208 mas
Distance	736 ± 3 ly (226 ± 1 pc)

Orbit
Primary	Aa
Name	Ab
Period (P)	70.12 yr
Semi-major axis (a)	0.165″
Eccentricity (e)	0.515
Longitude of the node (Ω)	100.6°
Periastron epoch (T)	B2050.0701
Argument of periastron (ω) (secondary)	295.1°

Details

Aa
Mass	4.02 M_{☉}
Radius	10.6 R_{☉}
Luminosity	394 L_{☉}
Surface gravity (log g)	3.90 cgs
Temperature	7,679 K
Rotation	25
Age	1.52 years

Ab
Mass	2.01 M_{☉}

B
Mass	1.34 M_{☉}
Radius	1.58 R_{☉}
Luminosity	4.10 L_{☉}
Surface gravity (log g)	4.17 cgs
Temperature	6,529 K
Age	2.75 Gyr

Other designations
- BD+41 4933, HD 225218, HIP 365, HR 9105, NSV 15012, SAO 36037, WDS J00046+4206

Database references
SIMBAD	A
- B

HD 225218 is a quadruple star system in the northern constellation of Andromeda. The primary component, HD 225218 A, is a giant star with a stellar classification of B9III, an apparent magnitude of 6.16, and is a candidate Lambda Boötis star. It has a fainter, magnitude 9.65 companion, HD 225218 B, at an angular separation of 5.2″ along a position angle of 171°. The primary itself has been identified as a binary star system through interferometry, with the two components separated by 0.165″. The pair, HD 225218 Aa and Ab, orbit each other with a period of about 70 years and an eccentricity of 0.515. Component B has been suspected to itself be a spectroscopic binary, but it is now thought that component A contains a third low-mass star.
