= HD 5788 and HD 5789 =

Binary star system in the constellation Andromeda

HD 5789/5788
Observation data Epoch J2000 Equinox ICRS
- Constellation: Andromeda
- HD 5789
- Right ascension: 01^{h} 00^{m} 03.55767^{s}
- Declination: +44° 42′ 47.6898″
- Apparent magnitude (V): 6.06
- HD 5788
- Right ascension: 01^{h} 00^{m} 03.38277^{s}
- Declination: +44° 42′ 40.0515″
- Apparent magnitude (V): 6.763

Characteristics

HD 5789
- Evolutionary stage: main sequence
- Spectral type: B9.5Vnn (λ Boo)
- B−V color index: −0.031

HD 5788
- Evolutionary stage: main sequence
- Spectral type: A2 Vn
- B−V color index: −0.010

Astrometry

HD 5789
Radial velocity (R_{v})	+4.4±3.3 km/s
Proper motion (μ)	RA: +13.85 mas/yr Dec.: −23.83 mas/yr
Parallax (π)	6.6432±0.0809 mas
Distance	491 ± 6 ly (151 ± 2 pc)

HD 5788
Proper motion (μ)	RA: +11.582 mas/yr Dec.: −24.369 mas/yr
Parallax (π)	6.5625±0.0688 mas
Distance	497 ± 5 ly (152 ± 2 pc)

Details

HD 5789
Mass	2.74±0.12 M_{☉}
Radius	3.2 R_{☉}
Luminosity	85.6+19.2 −15.6 L_{☉}
Surface gravity (log g)	3.82 cgs
Temperature	9,977 K
Rotational velocity (v sin i)	249 km/s

HD 5788
Mass	2.67±0.12 M_{☉}
Radius	2.2 R_{☉}
Luminosity	73.3+18.4 −14.7 L_{☉}
Surface gravity (log g)	4.18 cgs
Temperature	9,840 K
Rotational velocity (v sin i)	270 km/s

Other designations
- BD+43°193, HIP 4675, ADS 824, WDS J01001+4443
- HD 5789: HR 283, SAO 36833
- HD 5788: HR 282, SAO 36832

Database references
SIMBAD	HD 5789
- HD 5788

HD 5789 and HD 5788 is a pair of stars comprising a binary star system in the northern constellation of Andromeda. Located approximately 151 parsecs (490 ly) away, the primary is a hot, massive blue star with an apparent magnitude of 6.06 while the secondary is slightly smaller and cooler, with an apparent magnitude of 6.76. Both stars are main-sequence stars, meaning that they are currently fusing hydrogen into helium in their cores. As of 2016, the pair had an angular separation of 7.90″ along a position angle of 195°. While both have a similar proper motion and parallax, there's still no proof that the pair is gravitationally bound.

The primary component is HD 5789, a B-type main-sequence star with a stellar classification of B9.5Vnn (λ Boo), where the 'n' indicates "nebulous" lines due to rapid rotation. Abt and Morrell (1995) listed it as a Lambda Boötis star, although this is disputed. It has 2.7 times the mass of the Sun and is spinning rapidly with a projected rotational velocity of 249 km/s. The star is radiating 86 times the Sun's luminosity from its photosphere at an effective temperature of 9,977 K.

The fainter secondary component is an A-type main-sequence star with a class of A2 Vn. It shows a projected rotational velocity of 270 km/s and has 2.7 times the Sun's mass. The star shines with 73 times the Sun's luminosity at an effective temperature of 9,840 K.
