= 59 Andromedae =

Binary star system in the constellation Andromeda

- Location of 59 Andromedae (circled)

Observation data Epoch J2000 Equinox ICRS
- Constellation: Andromeda
- 59 And A
- Right ascension: 02^{h} 10^{m} 52.82448^{s}
- Declination: +39° 02′ 22.3538″
- Apparent magnitude (V): 6.09
- 59 And B
- Right ascension: 02^{h} 10^{m} 53.65660^{s}
- Declination: +39° 02′ 35.9142″
- Apparent magnitude (V): 6.82

Characteristics

59 And A
- Evolutionary stage: main sequence
- Spectral type: B9 V
- B−V color index: −0.054±0.006

59 And B
- Evolutionary stage: main sequence
- Spectral type: A1 Vn
- B−V color index: +0.081±0.005

Astrometry

59 And A
Radial velocity (R_{v})	−1.00±3.4 km/s
Proper motion (μ)	RA: −13.492 mas/yr Dec.: −14.607 mas/yr
Parallax (π)	7.4763±0.0499 mas
Distance	436 ± 3 ly (133.8 ± 0.9 pc)

59 And B
Radial velocity (R_{v})	6.0±4.6 km/s
Proper motion (μ)	RA: −8.983 mas/yr Dec.: −17.071 mas/yr
Parallax (π)	7.4108±0.0359 mas
Distance	440 ± 2 ly (134.9 ± 0.7 pc)

Details

59 And A
Mass	2.87 M_{☉}
Radius	2.62 R_{☉}
Luminosity	91 L_{☉}
Surface gravity (log g)	4.06 cgs
Temperature	11,002 K
Rotational velocity (v sin i)	176 km/s
Age	218 Myr

59 And B
Mass	2.34 M_{☉}
Radius	2.23 R_{☉}
Luminosity	32 L_{☉}
Surface gravity (log g)	4.11 cgs
Temperature	9,226 K
Rotational velocity (v sin i)	233 km/s
Age	298 Myr

Other designations
- 59 And, BD+38°425, ADS 1683, WDS J02109+3902
- 59 And A: GC 2600, HD 13294, HIP 10176, HR 628, SAO 55330, PPM 67045
- 59 And B: GC 2602, HD 13295, HIP 10180, HR 629, SAO 55331, PPM 67046

Database references
SIMBAD	A
- B

59 Andromedae, abbreviated 59 And, is a binary star system in the northern constellation of Andromeda with a combined apparent magnitude of 5.64. 59 Andromedae is the Flamsteed designation. As of 2017, the pair had an angular separation of 16.60″ along a position angle (PA) of 36°. Compare this to a separation of 15.3″ along a PA of 35°, as measured in 1783. The two stars have an estimated physical separation of 1,370 AU.

The magnitude 6.09 primary component is a B-type main-sequence star with a stellar classification of B9 V. It has 2.62 times the Sun's radius and is radiating 91 times the Sun's luminosity from its photosphere at an effective temperature of 11,002 K. It is spinning with a projected rotational velocity of 176 km/s.

The secondary is a magnitude 6.82 A-type main-sequence star with a class of A1 Vn, where the 'n' suffix indicates "nebulous" lines due to rapid rotation. It is spinning with a high projected rotational velocity of 233 km/s. The star has 2.34 times the Sun's mass and 2.23 times the Sun's radius. It is radiating 32 times the luminosity of the Sun and has an effective temperature of 9,226 K.
