= HD 220105 =

White-hued star in the constellation Andromeda

Observation data Epoch J2000 Equinox J2000
- Constellation: Andromeda
- Right ascension: 23^{h} 20^{m} 44.09845^{s}
- Declination: +44° 06′ 58.1997″
- Apparent magnitude (V): 6.24

Characteristics
- Evolutionary stage: main sequence
- Spectral type: A5 Vn
- U−B color index: 0.10
- B−V color index: 0.14

Astrometry
Radial velocity (R_{v})	−1.8 km/s
Proper motion (μ)	RA: −9.582 mas/yr Dec.: −37.026 mas/yr
Parallax (π)	13.7783±0.0277 mas
Distance	236.7 ± 0.5 ly (72.6 ± 0.1 pc)
Absolute magnitude (M_{V})	+1.87

Details
Mass	1.85 M_{☉}
Radius	1.8 R_{☉}
Luminosity	18.6 L_{☉}
Surface gravity (log g)	4.19±0.14 cgs
Temperature	8,367±284 K
Rotational velocity (v sin i)	259 km/s
Age	525 Myr

Other designations
- BD+43°4440, HD 220105, HIP 115261, HR 8884, SAO 52927, WDS J23207+4407A

Database references
SIMBAD	data

HD 220105 is a star in the northern constellation of Andromeda, and a member of the Sirius supercluster. It lies near the lower limit of visibility to the naked eye at an apparent visual magnitude of 6.24, and can be a challenge to spot under normal viewing conditions. The star is located 238 light years away, based upon an annual parallax shift of 13.78 mas. It is moving closer to the Earth with a heliocentric radial velocity of −2 km/s.

This is an A-type main-sequence star with a stellar classification of A5 Vn, where the 'n' notation indicates "nebulous" absorption lines due to rapid rotation. It is around 525 million years old with a high projected rotational velocity of 259 km/s. The star has 1.85 times the mass of the Sun and is radiating 19 times the Sun's luminosity from its photosphere at an effective temperature of 8,367 K.

HD 220105 has a magnitude 10.13 companion located at an angular separation of 13.60″ along a position angle of 178°, as of 2015, and it is listed as a close binary by Zorec and Royer (2012). These coordinates are a source for X-ray emission with a luminosity of 1.212×10^{22} W, which is most likely coming from the faint companion.
