= HD 3322 =

Binary star in the constellation Andromeda

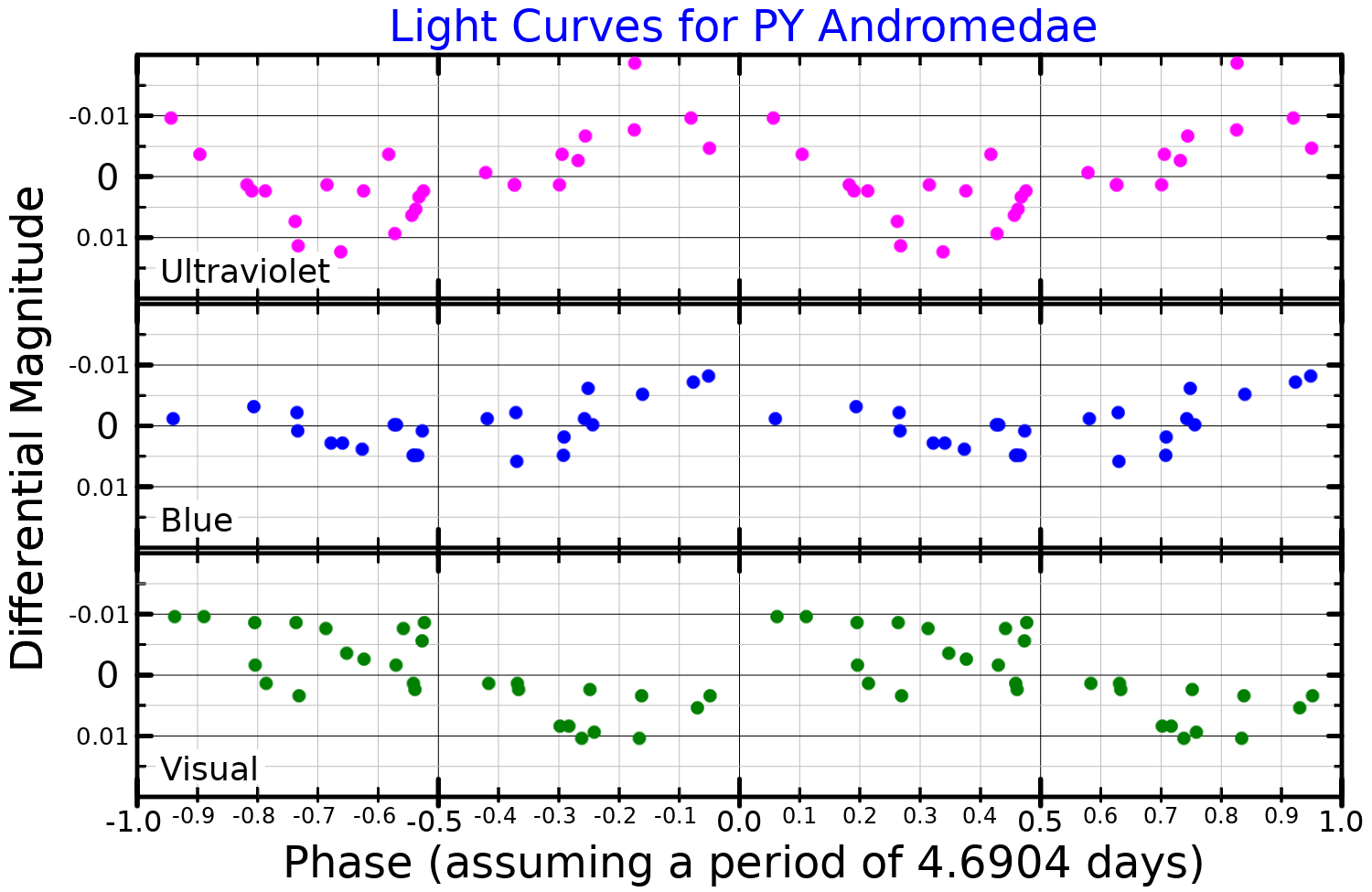
- Ultraviolet, blue and visual band light curves for PY Andromedae, plotted from data published by Catalano and Leone (1991)

Observation data Epoch J2000 Equinox ICRS
- Constellation: Andromeda
- Right ascension: 00^{h} 36^{m} 20.09863^{s}
- Declination: +27° 15′ 17.1519″
- Apparent magnitude (V): 6.51

Characteristics
- Evolutionary stage: Main sequence
- Spectral type: B8.5 IIIp HgMn
- B−V color index: −0.070±0.011
- Variable type: α^{2} CVn

Astrometry
Radial velocity (R_{v})	+4.0±7.4 km/s
Proper motion (μ)	RA: +15.96 mas/yr Dec.: −11.11 mas/yr
Parallax (π)	4.59±0.65 mas
Distance	approx. 700 ly (approx. 220 pc)
Absolute magnitude (M_{V})	−0.13

Orbit
Period (P)	399.6±2.1 d
Eccentricity (e)	0.57±0.09
Periastron epoch (T)	2440462.38 ± 6.05 JD
Argument of periastron (ω) (secondary)	304±11°
Semi-amplitude (K_{1}) (primary)	8.07±1.07 km/s

Details

HD 3322 A
Mass	3.68±0.21 M_{☉}
Radius	4.8 R_{☉}
Luminosity	246+91 −66 L_{☉}
Surface gravity (log g)	3.821±0.056 cgs
Temperature	12,882+90 −88 K
Rotational velocity (v sin i)	14 km/s

Other designations
- PY And, BD+26° 91, HD 3322, HIP 2865, HR 149, SAO 74136, PPM 89965

Database references
SIMBAD	data

HD 3322 is a binary star system in the northern constellation of Andromeda. With an apparent visual magnitude of 6.51, it lies below the nominal brightness limit for visibility with the normal naked eye, but it is still possible to see the star with excellent vision under ideal seeing conditions. An annual parallax shift of 4.59±0.65 mas provides a distance estimate of roughly 700 light years.

This is a single-lined spectroscopic binary star system with an orbital period of around 400 days and an eccentricity of 0.57. The visible component has a stellar classification of B8.5 IIIp HgMn, matching a chemically peculiar B-type giant mercury-manganese star. Catalano and Leone (1991) found it to be a α^{2} CVn variable with a period of 4.6904 days, and thus it received the variable star designation PY And. It has an estimated 3.7 times the mass of the Sun and about 4.8 times the Sun's radius. It is radiating around 246 times the Sun's luminosity from its photosphere at an effective temperature of 12,882 K.
