= V385 Andromedae =

Star in the constellation Andromeda

- Location of V385 Andromedae (circled)

Observation data Epoch J2000 Equinox ICRS
- Constellation: Andromeda
- Right ascension: 23^{h} 24^{m} 08.868^{s}
- Declination: +41° 36′ 46.35″
- Apparent magnitude (V): 6.413

Characteristics
- Evolutionary stage: Red giant
- Spectral type: M0
- B−V color index: +1.66
- Variable type: LB

Astrometry
Proper motion (μ)	RA: -12.02 ± 0.31 mas/yr Dec.: 2.46 ± 0.29 mas/yr
Parallax (π)	2.7775±0.1334 mas
Distance	1,170 ± 60 ly (360 ± 20 pc)

Details
Radius	113 R_{☉}
Luminosity	1,843 L_{☉}
Temperature	3,563 K

Other designations
- HD 220524, BD+40 5065, HIP 115530, SAO 52978, PPM 64169

Database references
SIMBAD	data

V385 Andromedae is a variable star in the constellation Andromeda, about 360 parsecs (1,200 ly) away. It is a red giant over a hundred times larger than the sun. It has an apparent magnitude around 6.4, just about visible to the naked eye in ideal conditions.

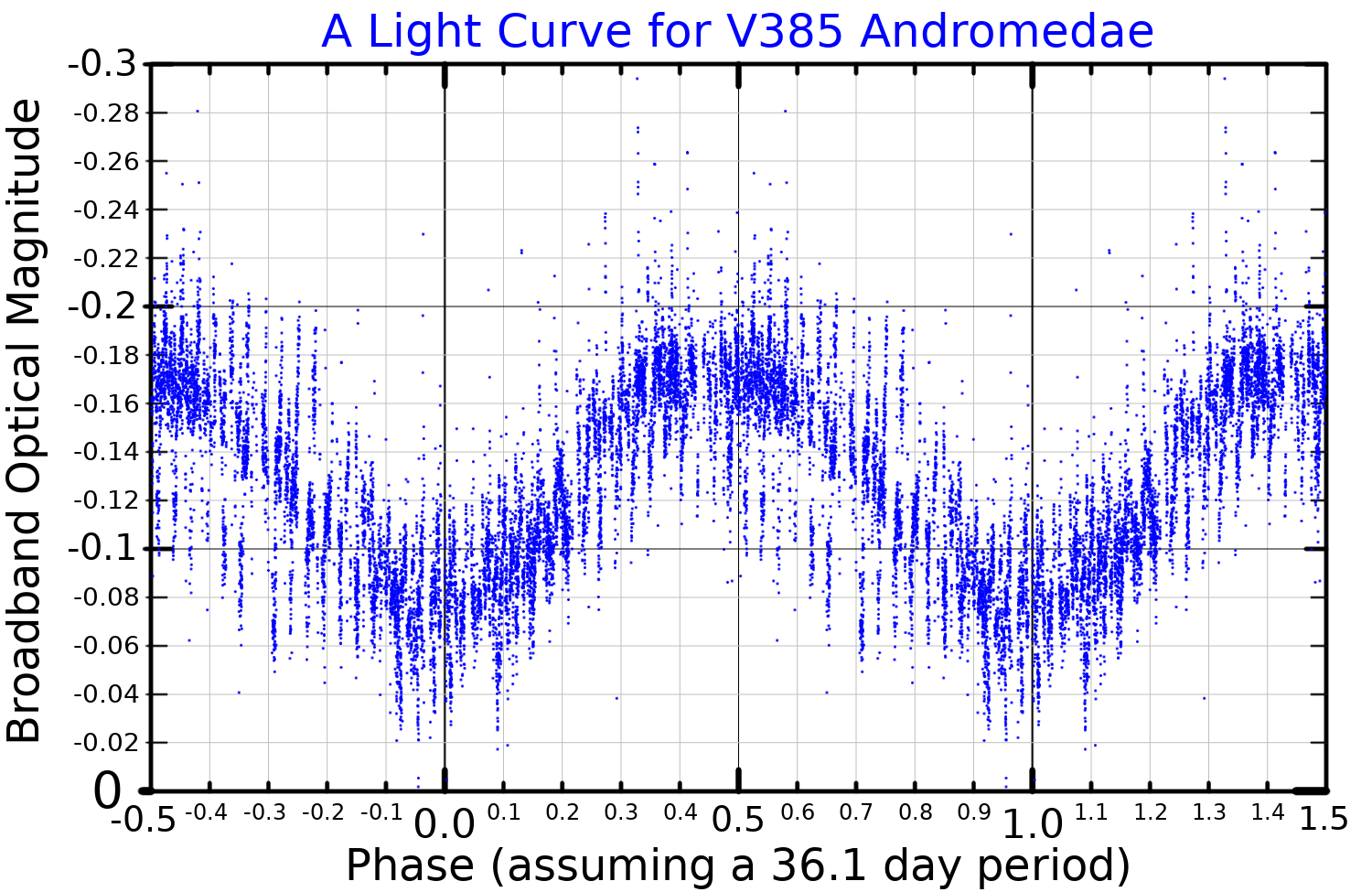
A light curve for V385 Andromedae, plotted from MASCARA data

V385 Andromedae was identified as a long-period variable in 1999 from analysis of Hipparcos photometry. It was classified as a slow irregular variable, but analysis of its light curve identified a possible 36 day period. It varies by about 0.1 magnitudes.
