= HD 4778 =

Star in the constellation Andromeda

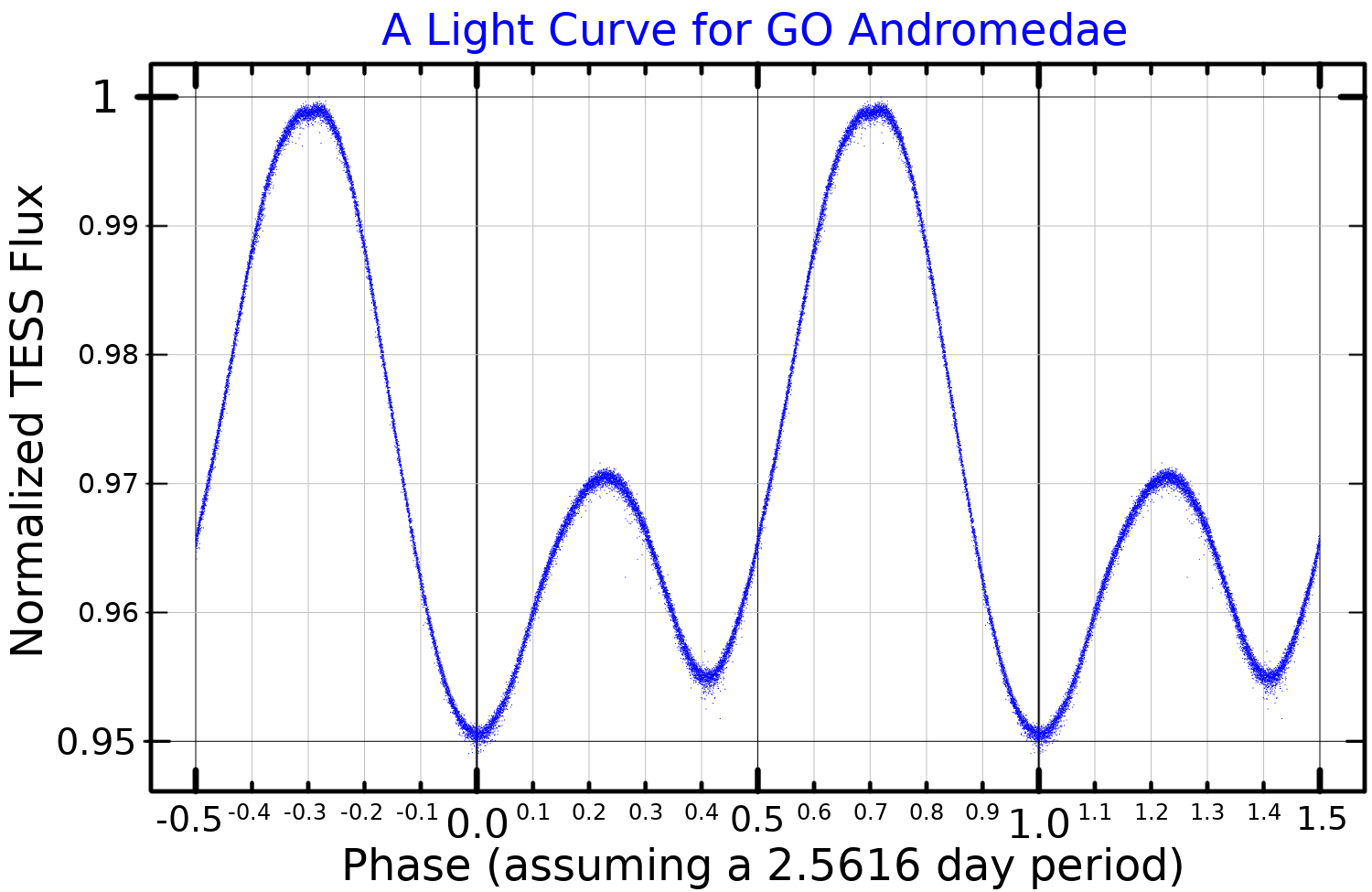
- A light curve for GO Andromedae, plotted from TESS data

Observation data Epoch J2000 Equinox ICRS
- Constellation: Andromeda
- Right ascension: 00^{h} 50^{m} 18.26532^{s}
- Declination: +45° 00′ 08.1355″
- Apparent magnitude (V): 6.13

Characteristics
- Evolutionary stage: main sequence
- Spectral type: A3VpSiSrCrEuKsn
- B−V color index: 0.043±0.004
- Variable type: α^{2} CVn

Astrometry
Radial velocity (R_{v})	1.60 km/s
Proper motion (μ)	RA: +65.570 mas/yr Dec.: +4.662 mas/yr
Parallax (π)	9.6184±0.0488 mas
Distance	339 ± 2 ly (104.0 ± 0.5 pc)
Absolute magnitude (M_{V})	1.18

Details
Mass	2.24±0.09 M_{☉}
Radius	2.36±0.12 R_{☉}
Luminosity	34.9±4.3 L_{☉}
Surface gravity (log g)	4.12±0.09 cgs
Temperature	9,135±400 K
Rotation	2.5616 days
Rotational velocity (v sin i)	33 km/s
Age	77 Myr

Other designations
- GO Andromedae, BD+44° 176, FK5 2055, HD 4778, HIP 3919, HR 234, SAO 36702, PPM 43369

Database references
SIMBAD	data

HD 4778, also known as HR 234 and GO Andromedae, is a variable star in the constellation Andromeda. Its magnitude varies by 0.04 magnitudes from the median of 6.12 with a period of approximately 2.55 days. The star is located 350 light years away, as determined from its annual parallax shift of 9.62 mas.

This is an Ap star with a stellar classification of A3VpSiSrCrEuKsn, showing chemical peculiarities in its spectrum from strontium, chromium, and europium. It is an Alpha^{2} Canum Venaticorum variable with a magnetic field that varies across the range +1,400 to −1,100 G. This rotation-modulated variability allows direct determination of the rotation rate of 2.5616 days.

HD 4778 has 2.24 times the mass of the Sun and 2.36 times the Sun's radius. The star is radiating 35 times the Sun's luminosity from its photosphere at an effective temperature of 9,375 K. It is about 77 million years old.
