= NGC 7686 =

Open cluster in the constellation Andromeda

- NGC 7686 captured in 2026

Observation data (J2000 epoch)
- Right ascension: 23^{h} 29^{m} 41.(3)^{s}
- Declination: +49° 10′ 1(2)″
- Apparent magnitude (V): 5.6
- Apparent dimensions (V): 15′

Physical characteristics
- Other designations: Cr 456, C2327+488, Herschel VIII69

Associations
- Constellation: Andromeda

NGC 7686 is a moderately-sized open cluster in the constellation Andromeda, containing about 80 stars. At magnitude 5.6, it is an easy target for binoculars and small telescopes.

According to Johnson et al. (1961), the "color-magnitude diagram shows merely a uniform scatter with no significant tendency to show a cluster main sequence". They conclude that this is not actually a star cluster.

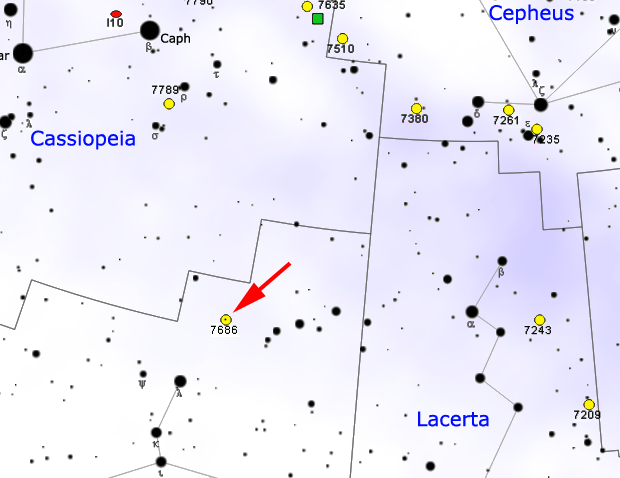
Map showing location of NGC 7686
