= OU Andromedae =

Rotationally variable star in the constellation Andromeda

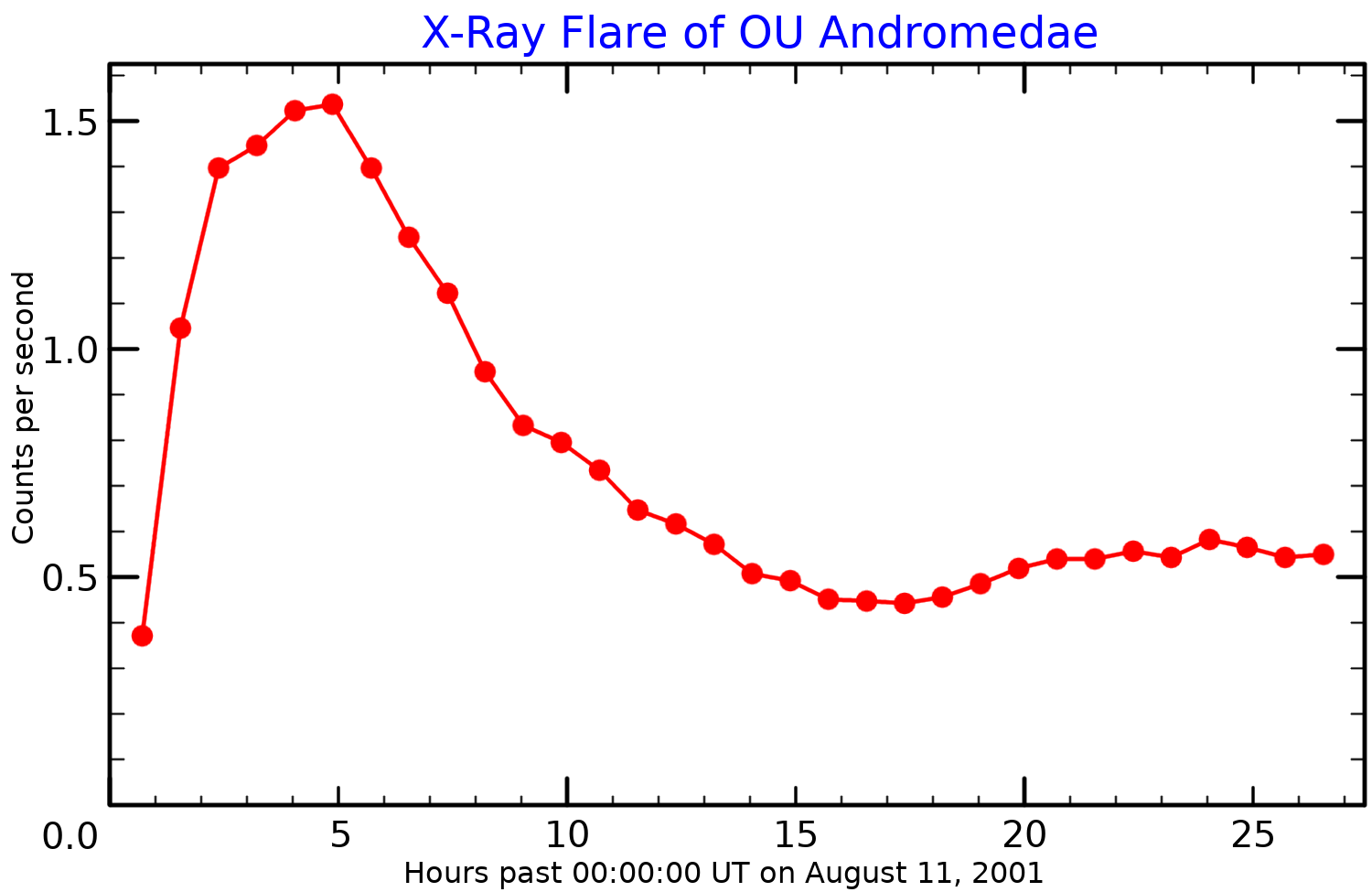
- The light curve of an X-ray flare observed in 2001 by the Chandra X-ray Observatory is shown. This flare is believed to have been produced by a coronal mass ejection. (Adapted from Argiroffi et al., 2019)

Observation data Epoch J2000 Equinox ICRS
- Constellation: Andromeda
- Right ascension: 23^{h} 49^{m} 40.9595^{s}
- Declination: +36° 25′ 31.013″
- Apparent magnitude (V): 5.87 - 5.94

Characteristics
- Evolutionary stage: subgiant
- Spectral type: G1 IIIe
- Apparent magnitude (G): 5.638
- Apparent magnitude (J): 4.723
- Apparent magnitude (H): 4.208
- Apparent magnitude (K): 4.097
- B−V color index: 0.79
- Variable type: FK Com

Astrometry
Radial velocity (R_{v})	−1.79±0.14 km/s
Proper motion (μ)	RA: −0.634±0.046 mas/yr Dec.: −47.740±0.028 mas/yr
Parallax (π)	7.2647±0.0411 mas
Distance	449 ± 3 ly (137.7 ± 0.8 pc)

Details
Mass	2.85 M_{☉}
Radius	9.46 R_{☉}
Luminosity	71.2 L_{☉}
Surface gravity (log g)	2.8 cgs
Temperature	5,360 K
Metallicity [Fe/H]	−0.07 dex
Rotation	24.3 days
Rotational velocity (v sin i)	21.5 km/s
Age	346 Myr

Other designations
- 2MASS J23494097+3625309, FK5 3914, HIP 117503, SAO 73535, BD+35°5110, HR 9024, HD 223460, PPM 89159

Database references
SIMBAD	data

OU Andromedae (also HR 9024) is a rotationally variable star in the constellation Andromeda. Varying between magnitudes 5.87 and 5.94, it has been classified as an FK Comae Berenices variable, but the classification is still uncertain. It has a spectral classification of G1IIIe, meaning that it is a giant star that shows emission lines in its spectrum. It is considered to be on the subgiant branch, contracting across the Hertzsprung gap towards the red giant branch.

In 1985, Jeffrey Hopkins et al. discovered that HR 9024 is a variable star, with a period of ~23.3 days. It was given the variable star designation OU Andromedae in 1986. Paola Testa et al. reported that the star showed X-ray flare activity, in 2007.

== Fast rotation ==
The spin rate of OU Andromedae is unusually high for an evolved star of this type, showing a projected rotational velocity of 21.5 km/s. One possible explanation is that it may have engulfed a nearby giant planet, such as a hot Jupiter, since an infrared excess has been observed. Another explanation relies on its strong magnetic field; if OU Andromedae was an Ap star during its main sequence stage of evolution, it could have retained both the strong magnetic field and the fast rotation of Ap stars.

== X-ray source ==
OU Andromedae is a bright X-ray source, due to the activity of its corona; it's estimated that solar-like active regions cover 30% of the surface. This is another effect of the strong magnetic field, which produces an uninterrupted flaring activity that generates a large volume of hot plasma at coronal temperatures (~7.5×10^{6} K).
