= Andromeda in Chinese astronomy =

The modern constellation Andromeda lies across two of the quadrants, symbolized by the Black Tortoise of the North (北方玄武, Běi Fāng Xuán Wǔ) and the White Tiger of the West (西方白虎, Xī Fāng Bái Hǔ), that divide the sky in traditional Chinese uranography.

The name of the western constellation in modern Chinese is 仙女座 (xiān nǚ zuò), meaning "the immortal woman / fairy constellation".

== Stars ==
The map of Chinese constellation in constellation Andromeda area consists of:

Four Symbols	Mansion (Chinese name)	Romanization	Translation	Asterisms (Chinese name)	Romanization	Translation	Western star name	Proper Name	Chinese star name	Romanization	Translation	
Black Tortoise of the North (北方玄武)	室	Shì	Encampment	騰蛇	Téngshé	Flying Serpent						
Black Tortoise of the North (北方玄武)	室	Shì	Encampment	騰蛇	Téngshé	Flying Serpent	3 And		騰蛇十六	Téngshéshíliù	16th star	
Black Tortoise of the North (北方玄武)	室	Shì	Encampment	騰蛇	Téngshé	Flying Serpent	7 And	Honores	螣蛇十七	Téngshéshíqī	17th star	
Black Tortoise of the North (北方玄武)	室	Shì	Encampment	騰蛇	Téngshé	Flying Serpent	8 And		螣蛇十八	Téngshéshíbā	18th star	
Black Tortoise of the North (北方玄武)	室	Shì	Encampment	騰蛇	Téngshé	Flying Serpent	λ And	Udkadua	螣蛇十九	Téngshéshíjiǔ	19th star	
Black Tortoise of the North (北方玄武)	室	Shì	Encampment	騰蛇	Téngshé	Flying Serpent	ψ And		螣蛇二十	Téngshéèrshí	20th star	
Black Tortoise of the North (北方玄武)	室	Shì	Encampment	騰蛇	Téngshé	Flying Serpent	κ And	Kaffalmusalsala	螣蛇二十一	Téngshéèrshíyī	21st star	
Black Tortoise of the North (北方玄武)	室	Shì	Encampment	騰蛇	Téngshé	Flying Serpent	ι And	Rasalnaqa	螣蛇二十二	Téngshéèrshíèr	22nd star	
Black Tortoise of the North (北方玄武)	室	Shì	Encampment	騰蛇	Téngshé	Flying Serpent	5 And		螣蛇增二	Téngshézēngèr	2nd additional star	
Black Tortoise of the North (北方玄武)	室	Shì	Encampment	騰蛇	Téngshé	Flying Serpent	11 And		螣蛇增三	Téngshézēngsān	3rd additional star	
Black Tortoise of the North (北方玄武)	室	Shì	Encampment	騰蛇	Téngshé	Flying Serpent	4 And		螣蛇增四	Téngshézēngsì	4th additional star	
Black Tortoise of the North (北方玄武)	室	Shì	Encampment	騰蛇	Téngshé	Flying Serpent	13 And		螣蛇增五	Téngshézēngwǔ	5th additional star	
Black Tortoise of the North (北方玄武)	室	Shì	Encampment	騰蛇	Téngshé	Flying Serpent	10 And		螣蛇增六	Téngshézēngliù	6th additional star	
Black Tortoise of the North (北方玄武)	室	Shì	Encampment	騰蛇	Téngshé	Flying Serpent	9 And		螣蛇增七	Téngshézēngqī	7th additional star	
Black Tortoise of the North (北方玄武)	室	Shì	Encampment	騰蛇	Téngshé	Flying Serpent	12 And		螣蛇增八	Téngshézēngbā	8th additional star	
Black Tortoise of the North (北方玄武)	室	Shì	Encampment	騰蛇	Téngshé	Flying Serpent	14 And	Veritate	螣蛇增九	Téngshézēngjiǔ	9th additional star	
Black Tortoise of the North (北方玄武)	室	Shì	Encampment	騰蛇	Téngshé	Flying Serpent	15 And		螣蛇增十	Téngshézēngshí	10th additional star	
Black Tortoise of the North (北方玄武)	室	Shì	Encampment	騰蛇	Téngshé	Flying Serpent	22 And	Tianjiu	螣蛇增十一	Téngshézēngshíyī	11th additional star	
Black Tortoise of the North (北方玄武)	室	Shì	Encampment	騰蛇	Téngshé	Flying Serpent	18 And		螣蛇增十二	Téngshézēngshíèr	12th additional star	
Black Tortoise of the North (北方玄武)	室	Shì	Encampment	騰蛇	Téngshé	Flying Serpent	HD 219962		螣蛇增十七	Téngshézēngshíqī	17th additional star	
Black Tortoise of the North (北方玄武)	壁	Bì	Wall	壁	Bì	Wall	α And	Alpheratz				
Black Tortoise of the North (北方玄武)	壁	Bì	Wall	壁	Bì	Wall	α And	Alpheratz	壁宿二	Bìsùèr	2nd star	
Black Tortoise of the North (北方玄武)	壁	Bì	Wall	壁	Bì	Wall	α And	Alpheratz	壁宿距星	Bìsùjùxīng	Separated star	
Black Tortoise of the North (北方玄武)	壁	Bì	Wall	壁	Bì	Wall	α And	Alpheratz	壁宿北星	Bìsùběixīng	Northern star	
Black Tortoise of the North (北方玄武)	壁	Bì	Wall	天廄	Tiānjiù	Celestial Stable						
Black Tortoise of the North (北方玄武)	壁	Bì	Wall	天廄	Tiānjiù	Celestial Stable	θ And		天廄一	Tiānjiùyī	1st star	
Black Tortoise of the North (北方玄武)	壁	Bì	Wall	天廄	Tiānjiù	Celestial Stable	ρ And		天廄二	Tiānjiùèr	2nd star	
Black Tortoise of the North (北方玄武)	壁	Bì	Wall	天廄	Tiānjiù	Celestial Stable	σ And		天廄三	Tiānjiùsān	3rd star	
Black Tortoise of the North (北方玄武)	壁	Bì	Wall	天廄	Tiānjiù	Celestial Stable	23 And		天廄增一	Tiānjiùzēngyī		1st additional star
Black Tortoise of the North (北方玄武)	危	Wēi	Rooftop	車府	Chēfǔ	Big Yard for Chariots						
Black Tortoise of the North (北方玄武)	危	Wēi	Rooftop	車府	Chēfǔ	Big Yard for Chariots	ο And	Alfarasalkamil	府增十六	Chēfǔzēngshíliù	16th additional star	
Black Tortoise of the North (北方玄武)	危	Wēi	Rooftop	車府	Chēfǔ	Big Yard for Chariots	2 And		府增十七	Chēfǔzēngshíqī	17th additional star	
Black Tortoise of the North (北方玄武)	危	Wēi	Rooftop	車府	Chēfǔ	Big Yard for Chariots	6 And		府增十八	Chēfǔzēngshíbā	18th additional star	
White Tiger of the West (西方白虎)	奎	Kuí	Legs	奎	Kuí	Legs						
White Tiger of the West (西方白虎)	奎	Kuí	Legs	奎	Kuí	Legs	η And	Kui				
White Tiger of the West (西方白虎)	奎	Kuí	Legs	奎	Kuí	Legs	η And	Kui	奎宿一	Kuísùyī	1st star	
White Tiger of the West (西方白虎)	奎	Kuí	Legs	奎	Kuí	Legs	η And	Kui	奎宿西南小星	Kuísùxīnánxiǎoxīng	Little southwestern star	
White Tiger of the West (西方白虎)	奎	Kuí	Legs	奎	Kuí	Legs	ζ And	Shimu				
White Tiger of the West (西方白虎)	奎	Kuí	Legs	奎	Kuí	Legs	ζ And	Shimu	奎宿二	Kuísùèr	2nd star	
White Tiger of the West (西方白虎)	奎	Kuí	Legs	奎	Kuí	Legs	ζ And	Shimu	奎宿距星	Kuísùjùxīng	Separated star	
White Tiger of the West (西方白虎)	奎	Kuí	Legs	奎	Kuí	Legs	ζ And	Shimu	奎宿西南大星	Kuísùxīnándàxīng	Big southwestern star	
White Tiger of the West (西方白虎)	奎	Kuí	Legs	奎	Kuí	Legs	ζ And	Shimu	天豕目	Tiānshǐmù	Celestial pig's eye	
White Tiger of the West (西方白虎)	奎	Kuí	Legs	奎	Kuí	Legs	ζ And	Shimu	大将	Dàjiāng	Great general	
White Tiger of the West (西方白虎)	奎	Kuí	Legs	奎	Kuí	Legs	ε And	Anunitu	奎宿四	Kuísùsì	4th star	
White Tiger of the West (西方白虎)	奎	Kuí	Legs	奎	Kuí	Legs	δ And	Kuda (for component Aa)	奎宿五	Kuísùwǔ	5th star	
White Tiger of the West (西方白虎)	奎	Kuí	Legs	奎	Kuí	Legs	π And		奎宿六	Kuísùliù	6th star	
White Tiger of the West (西方白虎)	奎	Kuí	Legs	奎	Kuí	Legs	ν And		奎宿七	Kuísùqī	7th star	
White Tiger of the West (西方白虎)	奎	Kuí	Legs	奎	Kuí	Legs	μ And		奎宿八	Kuísùbā	8th star	
White Tiger of the West (西方白虎)	奎	Kuí	Legs	奎	Kuí	Legs	β And	Mirach				
White Tiger of the West (西方白虎)	奎	Kuí	Legs	奎	Kuí	Legs	β And	Mirach	奎宿九	Kuísùjiǔ	9th star	
White Tiger of the West (西方白虎)	奎	Kuí	Legs	奎	Kuí	Legs	β And	Mirach	奎大星	Kuídàxīng	Big star	
White Tiger of the West (西方白虎)	奎	Kuí	Legs	奎	Kuí	Legs	β And	Mirach	奎宿东北第三星	Kuísùdōngběidìsānxīng	3rd northeastern star	
White Tiger of the West (西方白虎)	奎	Kuí	Legs	奎	Kuí	Legs	28 And		奎宿增一	Kuísùzēngyī	1st additional star	
White Tiger of the West (西方白虎)	奎	Kuí	Legs	奎	Kuí	Legs	36 And		奎宿增九	Kuísùzēngqī	7th additional star	
White Tiger of the West (西方白虎)	奎	Kuí	Legs	奎	Kuí	Legs	45 And		奎宿增十六	Kuísùzēngshíliù	16th additional star	
White Tiger of the West (西方白虎)	奎	Kuí	Legs	奎	Kuí	Legs	47 And		奎宿增十七	Kuísùzēngshíqī	17th additional star	
White Tiger of the West (西方白虎)	奎	Kuí	Legs	奎	Kuí	Legs	44 And		奎宿增十八	Kuísùzēngshíbā	18th additional star	
White Tiger of the West (西方白虎)	奎	Kuí	Legs	奎	Kuí	Legs	41 And		奎宿增十九	Kuísùzēngshíjiǔ	19th additional star	
White Tiger of the West (西方白虎)	奎	Kuí	Legs	奎	Kuí	Legs	39 And		奎宿增二十	Kuísùzēngèrshí	20th additional star	
White Tiger of the West (西方白虎)	奎	Kuí	Legs	奎	Kuí	Legs	M31		奎宿增二十	Kuísùzēngèrshíyī	21st additional star	
White Tiger of the West (西方白虎)	奎	Kuí	Legs	奎	Kuí	Legs	32 And		奎宿增二十	Kuísùzēngèrshíèr	22nd additional star	
White Tiger of the West (西方白虎)	奎	Kuí	Legs	軍南門	Jūnnánmén	Southern Military Gate	φ And	Junnanmen	軍南門	Jūnnánmén	(One star of)	
White Tiger of the West (西方白虎)	婁	Lóu	Bond	天大將軍	Tiāndàjiāngjūn	Heaven's Great General						
White Tiger of the West (西方白虎)	婁	Lóu	Bond	天大將軍	Tiāndàjiāngjūn	Heaven's Great General	γ And	Almach (for γ¹And)				
White Tiger of the West (西方白虎)	婁	Lóu	Bond	天大將軍	Tiāndàjiāngjūn	Heaven's Great General	γ And	Almach (for γ¹And)	天大將軍一	Tiāndàjiāngjūnyī	1st star	
White Tiger of the West (西方白虎)	婁	Lóu	Bond	天大將軍	Tiāndàjiāngjūn	Heaven's Great General	γ And	Almach (for γ¹And)	天大將軍东中星	Tiāndàjiāngjūndōngzhōngxīng	Center eastern star	
White Tiger of the West (西方白虎)	婁	Lóu	Bond	天大將軍	Tiāndàjiāngjūn	Heaven's Great General	51 And	Nembus	天大將軍三	Tiāndàjiāngjūnsān	3rd star	
White Tiger of the West (西方白虎)	婁	Lóu	Bond	天大將軍	Tiāndàjiāngjūn	Heaven's Great General	49 And		天大將軍四	Tiāndàjiāngjūnsì	4th star	
White Tiger of the West (西方白虎)	婁	Lóu	Bond	天大將軍	Tiāndàjiāngjūn	Heaven's Great General	χ And		天大將軍五	Tiāndàjiāngjūnwu	5th star	
White Tiger of the West (西方白虎)	婁	Lóu	Bond	天大將軍	Tiāndàjiāngjūn	Heaven's Great General	υ And	Titawin (for component A)	天大將軍六	Tiāndàjiāngjūnliù	6th star	
White Tiger of the West (西方白虎)	婁	Lóu	Bond	天大將軍	Tiāndàjiāngjūn	Heaven's Great General	τ And		天大將軍七	Tiāndàjiāngjūnqī	7th star	
White Tiger of the West (西方白虎)	婁	Lóu	Bond	天大將軍	Tiāndàjiāngjūn	Heaven's Great General	56 And		天大將軍八	Tiāndàjiāngjūnbā	8th star	
White Tiger of the West (西方白虎)	婁	Lóu	Bond	天大將軍	Tiāndàjiāngjūn	Heaven's Great General	ξ And	Adhil	天大将军增一	Tiāndàjiāngjūnzēngyī	1st additional star	
White Tiger of the West (西方白虎)	婁	Lóu	Bond	天大將軍	Tiāndàjiāngjūn	Heaven's Great General	ω And		天大将军增三	Tiāndàjiāngjūnzēngsān	3rd additional star	
White Tiger of the West (西方白虎)	婁	Lóu	Bond	天大將軍	Tiāndàjiāngjūn	Heaven's Great General	τ And		天大将军增四	Tiāndàjiāngjūnzēngsì	4th additional star	
White Tiger of the West (西方白虎)	婁	Lóu	Bond	天大將軍	Tiāndàjiāngjūn	Heaven's Great General	58 And		天大将军增九	Tiāndàjiāngjūnzēngjiǔ	9th additional star	
White Tiger of the West (西方白虎)	婁	Lóu	Bond	天大將軍	Tiāndàjiāngjūn	Heaven's Great General	59 And		天大将军增十	Tiāndàjiāngjūnzēngshí	10th additional star	
White Tiger of the West (西方白虎)	婁	Lóu	Bond	天大將軍	Tiāndàjiāngjūn	Heaven's Great General	55 And		天大将军增十一	Tiāndàjiāngjūnzēngshíyī	11th additional star	
White Tiger of the West (西方白虎)	婁	Lóu	Bond	天大將軍	Tiāndàjiāngjūn	Heaven's Great General	60 And		天大将军增十二	Tiāndàjiāngjūnzēngshíèr	12th additional star	
White Tiger of the West (西方白虎)	婁	Lóu	Bond	天大將軍	Tiāndàjiāngjūn	Heaven's Great General	62 And		天大将军增十三	Tiāndàjiāngjūnzēngshísān	13th additional star	
White Tiger of the West (西方白虎)	婁	Lóu	Bond	天大將軍	Tiāndàjiāngjūn	Heaven's Great General	HD 14221		天大将军增十四	Tiāndàjiāngjūnzēngshísì	14th additional star	
White Tiger of the West (西方白虎)	胃	Wèi	Stomach	大陵	Dàlíng	Mausoleum						
White Tiger of the West (西方白虎)	胃	Wèi	Stomach	大陵	Dàlíng	Mausoleum	6 Per		大陵增六	Dàlíngzēngliù	6th additional star	
White Tiger of the West (西方白虎)	胃	Wèi	Stomach	大陵	Dàlíng	Mausoleum	63 And		大陵增七	Dàlíngzēngqī	7th additional star	
White Tiger of the West (西方白虎)	胃	Wèi	Stomach	大陵	Dàlíng	Mausoleum	64 And		天大陵增八	Dàlíngzēngbā	8th additional star	
White Tiger of the West (西方白虎)	胃	Wèi	Stomach	大陵	Dàlíng	Mausoleum	65 And		天大陵增九	Dàlíngzēngjiǔ	9th additional star	
White Tiger of the West (西方白虎)	胃	Wèi	Stomach	大陵	Dàlíng	Mausoleum	66 And		天大陵增十	Dàlíngzēngshí	10th additional star	

== See also ==
- Chinese astronomy
- Traditional Chinese star names
- Chinese constellations
