= Köhler's Deepsky Catalogue =

Astronomical catalogue

Köhler's Deepsky Catalogue is an astronomical catalogue assembled by Johann Gottfried Köhler in 1778. It was originally compiled in a letter to Johann Elert Bode. Although not numbered, two additional objects are listed by Köhler that he had recently discovered. In total, the catalogue contains eleven globular clusters, four open clusters, two spiral galaxies, two elliptical galaxies, one emission nebula, one planetary nebula, two asterisms, and three lost objects. At Köhler's time, all these various objects were referred to as nebulae.

== List ==
Köhler's Deepsky Catalogue
Köhler no.	Image	Common name	NGC/Messier no.
K 1	An infrared view of the Messier 22 globular cluster (eso2413d) (cropped)	Great Sagittarius Cluster	Messier 22
K 2	M28 is a globular cluster in the constellation Sagittarius. Slightly elliptical in shape, it is around 80 light-years across and some 18000 light-years away.		Messier 28
K 3	LagoonHunterWilson	Lagoon Nebula	Messier 8
K 4	M10, or NGC6254, is a seventh magnitude globular cluster in the constellation Ophiuchus, close to M12. About 16000 light-years away and about 70 light-years across, M10 on the sky has about half the diameter of the full moon.		Messier 10
K 5		Gumball Globular	Messier 12
K 6	The Dumbbell Nebula, Messier object 27 (M27), NGC 6853, in the constellation Vulpecula, as seen by the Kitt Peak 4-meter Mayall telescope in 1988.	Dumbbell Nebula	Messier 27
K 7	M71	Angelfish Cluster	Messier 71
K 8A		Bode's Galaxy	Messier 81
K 8B		Cigar Galaxy	Messier 82
K 9			
K 10		Pinwheel Cluster	Messier 36
K 10		Starfish Cluster	Messier 38
K 12			
K 13		Rose Cluster	Messier 5
K 14	Messier 2 -HST-L hlsp acsggct hst acs-wfc ngc7089 f606w-AB R814GB606		Messier 2
K 15		Great Pegasus Cluster	Messier 15
K 16	Lost		
K 17A	Lost		
K 17B	Lost		
K 18		Great Hercules Cluster	Messier 13
K 19		Golden Eye Cluster	Messier 67
K 20		Wild Duck Cluster	Messier 11
			Messier 59
			Messier 60

== Mistakes ==
Köhler identified Bode's Galaxy and the Cigar Galaxy both under K 8. They are now clafiried as K 8A and K 8B respectively. K 9 is not an object but an asterism made of Rho Ursae Majoris, Sigma1 Ursae Majoris, and Sigma2 Ursae Majoris. K 12 is also an asterism, comprising 63, 64, 65, and 66 Andromedae. K 16 is considered a lost object, described as being located near 3 Vulpeculae. For K 17A and K 17B, Köhler describes two nebulas in the constellation Canes Venatici. However, it is unknown what objects this refers to.
