= NGC 4637 =

Galaxy

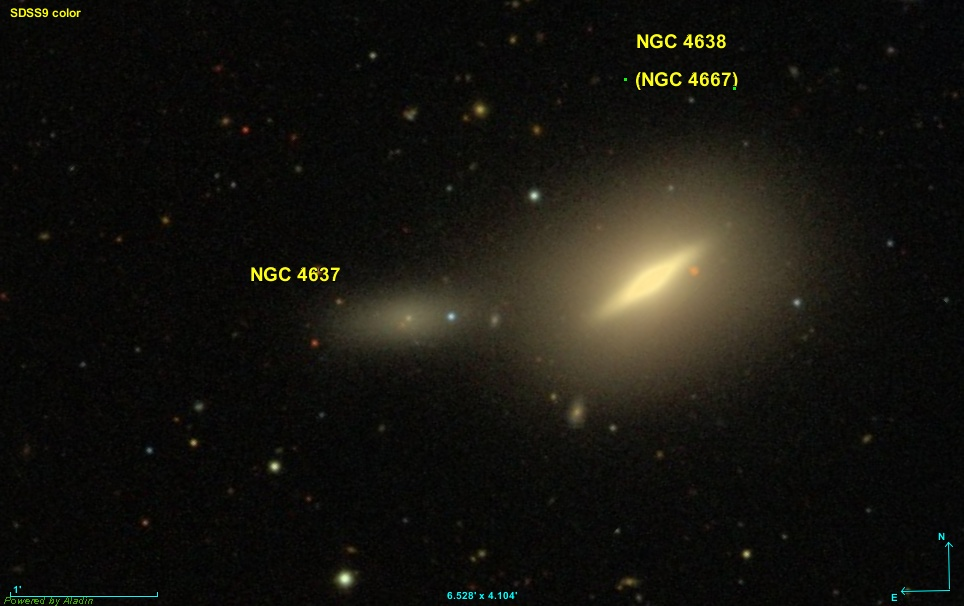
- NGC 4637 imaged by SDSS (left)

Observation data (J2000 epoch)
- Constellation: Virgo
- Right ascension: 12^{h} 42^{m} 54.1^{s}
- Declination: 11° 26′ 18″
- Apparent magnitude (B): 16.00

Characteristics
- Type: S0?
- Apparent size (V): 1.2' x 0.5'

Other designations
- UGC 7881, MCG +2-32-188, PGC 42744

NGC 4637 is a lenticular galaxy located in the constellation Virgo, originally discovered by R.J. Mitchell on March 1, 1854. It is a member of the Virgo Cluster, and is located in the sky very close to the brighter and larger galaxy NGC 4638, which historically led to some confusion upon discovery and later observations.

== See also ==
- New General Catalogue
- NGC 4638
