= Johann Gottfried Köhler =

German astronomer

- Born: 15 December 1745; Klipphausen
- Died: 19 September 1801 (aged 55)
- Occupation: Astronomer
- Known for: Discovery of Messier 59, Messier 60, and Messier 67.

Johann Gottfried Köhler (15 December 1745 – 19 September 1801) was a German astronomer who served as secretary of the Astronomical Society of Leipzig from 1771 to 1776.

Köhler is best remembered for his discovery of Messier objects Messier 59, Messier 60, and Messier 67. The first two were discovered on the same day, 11 April 1779.

He worked with the noted astronomer Johann Elert Bode, who refined and published Köhler's proposal for the symbol of Uranus. According to Bode, Köhler also discovered three objects in Virgo in May of 1779. It is unknown which objects these refer to. Astronomer Wolfgang Steinicke speculates these to be Messier 84, Messier 86, and Messier 87. If proven, it would mean Köhler is their discoverer, as all three proposed objects would not be discovered until they were discovered by Charles Messier two years later.

From 1784 he was the director of Mathematisch-Physikalischer Salon.

Köhler also assembled his own catalogue, known as Köhler's Deepsky Catalogue, containing objects he discovered. Some of the objects in this catalogue had been discovered before by other astronomers, unknown to Köhler at the time.
