= Messier 59 =

Elliptical galaxy in the constellation Virgo

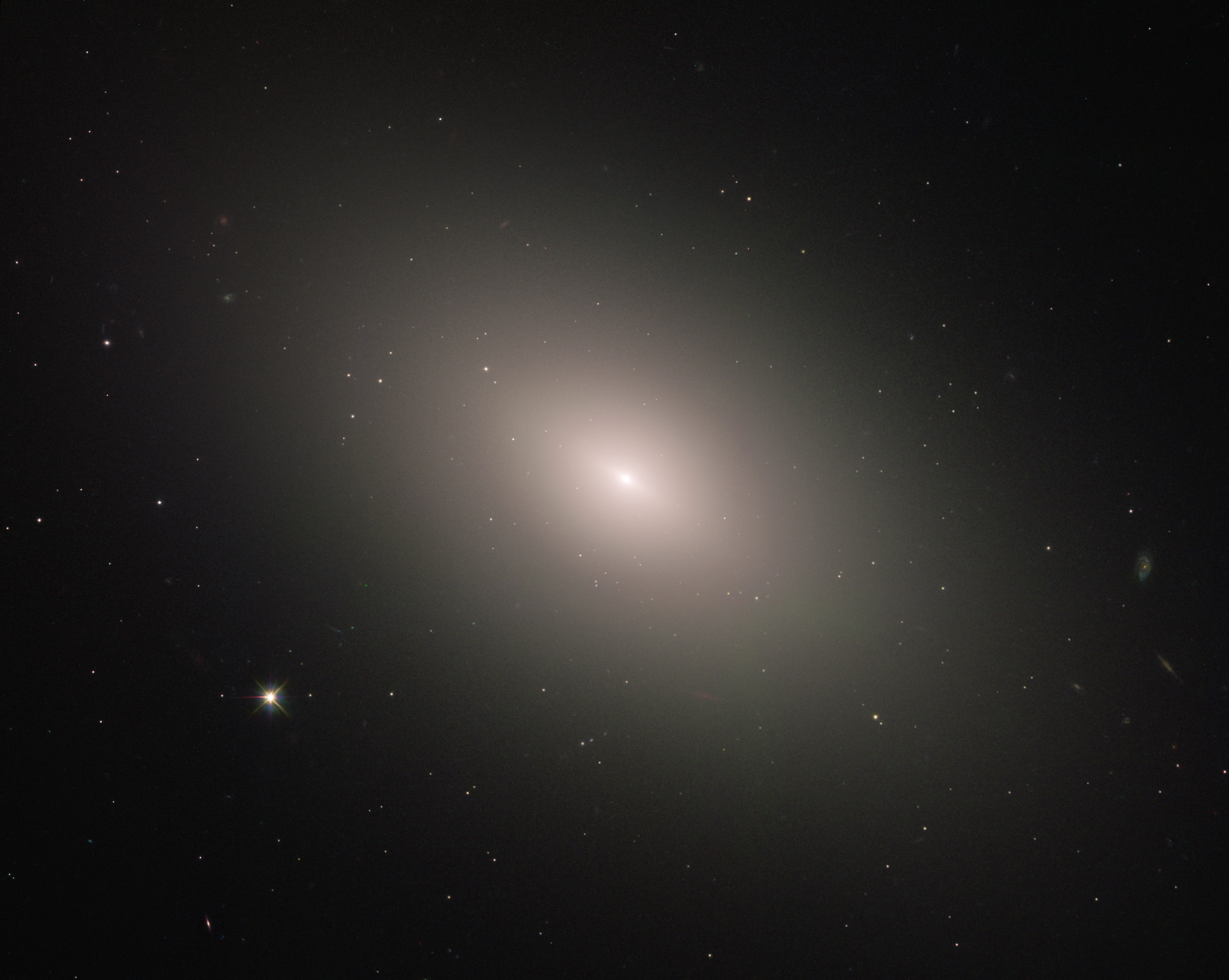
- Messier 59 taken by Hubble

Observation data (J2000 epoch)
- Constellation: Virgo
- Right ascension: 12^{h} 42^{m} 02.322^{s}
- Declination: +11° 38′ 48.95″
- Redshift: 430±13 km/s
- Distance: 50.1 Mly (15.35 Mpc)
- Group or cluster: Virgo Cluster
- Apparent magnitude (V): 9.6

Characteristics
- Type: E5
- Apparent size (V): 5.4′ × 3.7′
- Half-light radius (apparent): 46″

Other designations
- GC 3155, NGC 4621, UGC 7858, MCG +02-32-183, PGC 42628, CGCG 070-223

Messier 59 or M59, also known as NGC 4621, is an elliptical galaxy in the equatorial constellation of Virgo. It is a member of the Virgo Cluster, with the nearest fellow member 8′ away and around 5 magnitudes fainter. The nearest cluster member of comparable brightness is the lenticular galaxy NGC 4638, which is around 17′ away. It and the angularly nearby elliptical galaxy Messier 60 were both discovered by Johann Gottfried Koehler in April 1779 when observing comet seeming close by. Charles Messier listed both in the Messier Catalogue about three days after Koehler's discovery.

This is an elliptical galaxy of type E5 with a position angle of 163.3°, indicating the overall shape shows a flattening of 50%. However, isophotes for this galaxy deviate from a perfect ellipticity, showing pointed shapes instead. These can be decomposed mathematically into a three component model, with each part having a different eccentricity. The main elliptical component appears to be superimposed upon a flatter, disk-like feature, with the entirety embedded within a circular halo. The luminosity contribution of the components is 62% for the pure elliptical part, 22% for the halo, and the remainder coming from the disk. The light ratio of the disk to the main elliptical body is 0.25, whereas it is typically closer to 0.5 in a lenticular galaxy.

The core contains a supermassive black hole (SMBH), with a mass that has been estimated to be 270 million times the mass of the Sun, and counter-rotates with respect of the rest of the galaxy, being bluer. The SMBH is quiescent, but is detectable as an X-ray and radio source that indicates an outflow. The nucleus contains an embedded stellar disk that is bluer (younger) than the bulge region, with a blue component stretching along a position angle of around 150°. This extended disk feature may be the result of a galactic merger followed by a starburst event.

Messier 59 is very rich in globular clusters, with a population of them that has been estimated to be around 2,200. It has two satellites, the ultra compact dwarf galaxy M59-UCD3 and M59cO, which is a rare example of a galaxy in between compact ellipticals such as Messier 32 and ultra compact dwarfs.

== Supernova ==
One supernova has been recorded in M59: SN 1939B (Type Ia, mag. 15) was discovered by Fritz Zwicky on 19 May 1939. It reached a peak magnitude of 11.9. The region where this supernova occurred shows no trace of star formation, which suggests this was a Type Ia supernova.

== See also ==
- List of Messier objects
