= NGC 4647 =

Spiral galaxy in the constellation Virgo

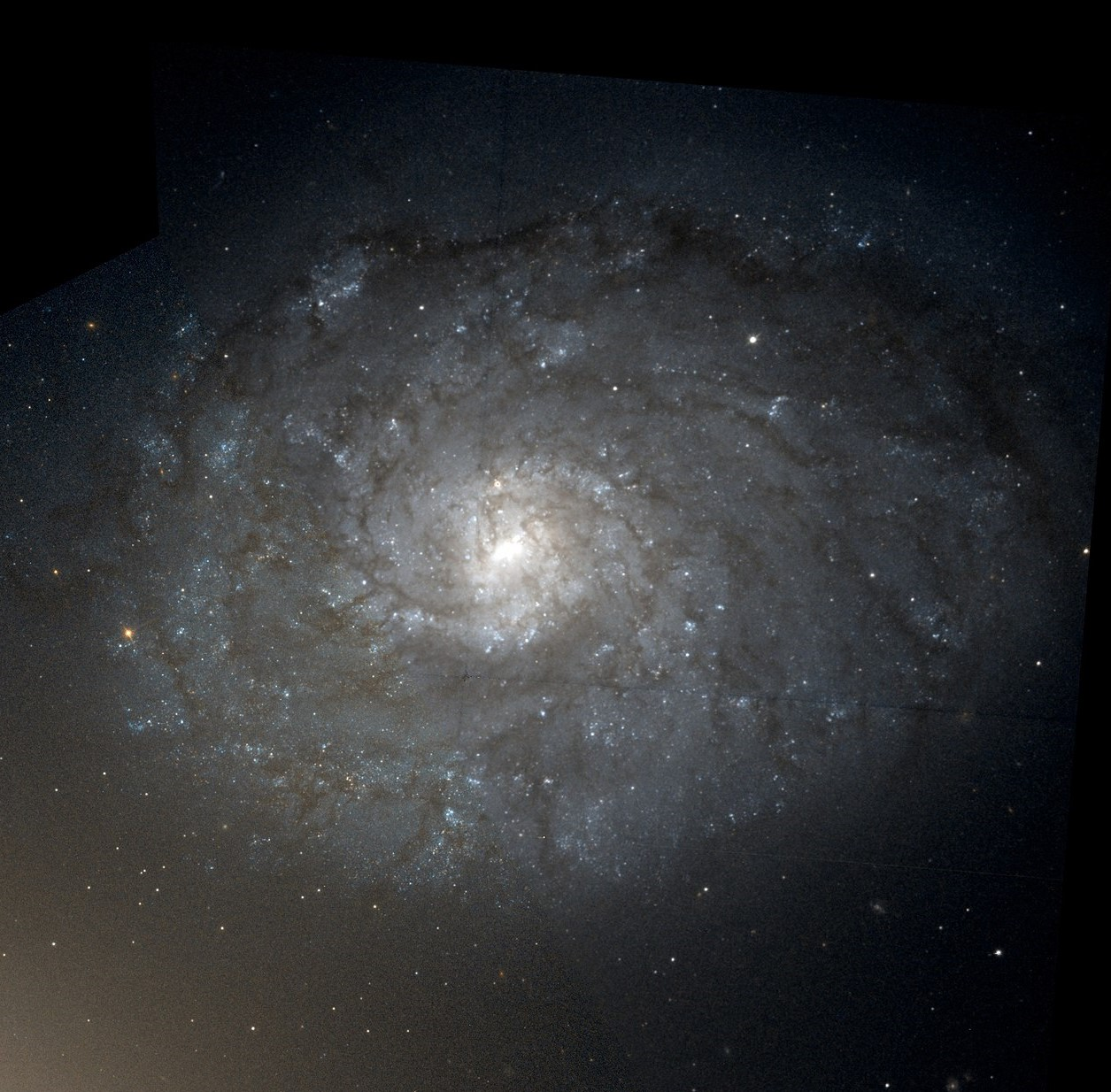
- NGC 4647 imaged by the Hubble Space Telescope

Observation data (J2000 epoch)
- Constellation: Virgo
- Right ascension: 12^{h} 43^{m} 32.3300^{s}
- Declination: +11° 34′ 58.000″
- Redshift: 0.004700
- Heliocentric radial velocity: 1,409±1 km/s
- Distance: 57.37 ± 2.99 Mly (17.591 ± 0.918 Mpc)
- Group or cluster: Virgo Cluster
- Apparent magnitude (V): 11.94

Characteristics
- Type: SAB(rs)c
- Size: ~78,000 ly (23.93 kpc) (estimated)
- Apparent size (V): 2.9′ × 2.3′

Other designations
- KCPG 353A, VCC 1972, HOLM 448B, IRAS 12410+1151, Arp 116, UGC 7896, MCG +02-33-001, PGC 42816, CGCG 071-015, VV 206

NGC 4647 is an intermediate spiral galaxy estimated to be around 63 million light-years away in the constellation of Virgo. It was discovered by German-British astronomer William Herschel on March 15, 1784. NGC 4647 is listed along with Messier 60 as being part of a pair of galaxies called Arp 116; their designation in Halton Arp's Atlas of Peculiar Galaxies. The galaxy is located on the outskirts of the Virgo Cluster.

== Interaction with Messier 60 ==
In optical images, the two galaxies' disks overlap. This has suggested an ongoing interaction, however images do not reveal any signs of star formation which would have been caused by a tidal interaction between the two galaxies. Recent studies of Hubble images made in 2012 of the two galaxies indicate that tidal interactions between the two have just begun.

== Interstellar medium of NGC 4647 ==
The gas in NGC 4647 has been mildly disturbed. The galaxy's location in the Virgo Cluster suggests that it might have suffered an effect known as ram-pressure stripping caused by the intracluster medium. Another explanation may be hot gas in the halo of Messier 60. The hot gas in Messier 60 may have increased the pressure of gas on the eastern side of NGC 4647 through either ram-pressure stripping or a bow-shock between the two galaxies causing the observed asymmetry of gas in the galaxy. The difficulty is that the galaxies would have to be so close that tidal forces from Messier 60 would cause the disk of NGC 4647 to get ripped apart.

== Supernovae ==
Two supernovae have been observed in NGC 4647:

- SN 1979A (type unknown, mag. 15) was discovered by Givi N. Kimeridze on 25 January 1979.
- SN 2022hrs (Type Ia, mag. 15) was discovered by Kōichi Itagaki on 16 April 2022.

== See also ==
- List of NGC objects (4001–5000)
- NGC 4567 and NGC 4568
