= Messier 60 =

Elliptical galaxy in the constellation Virgo

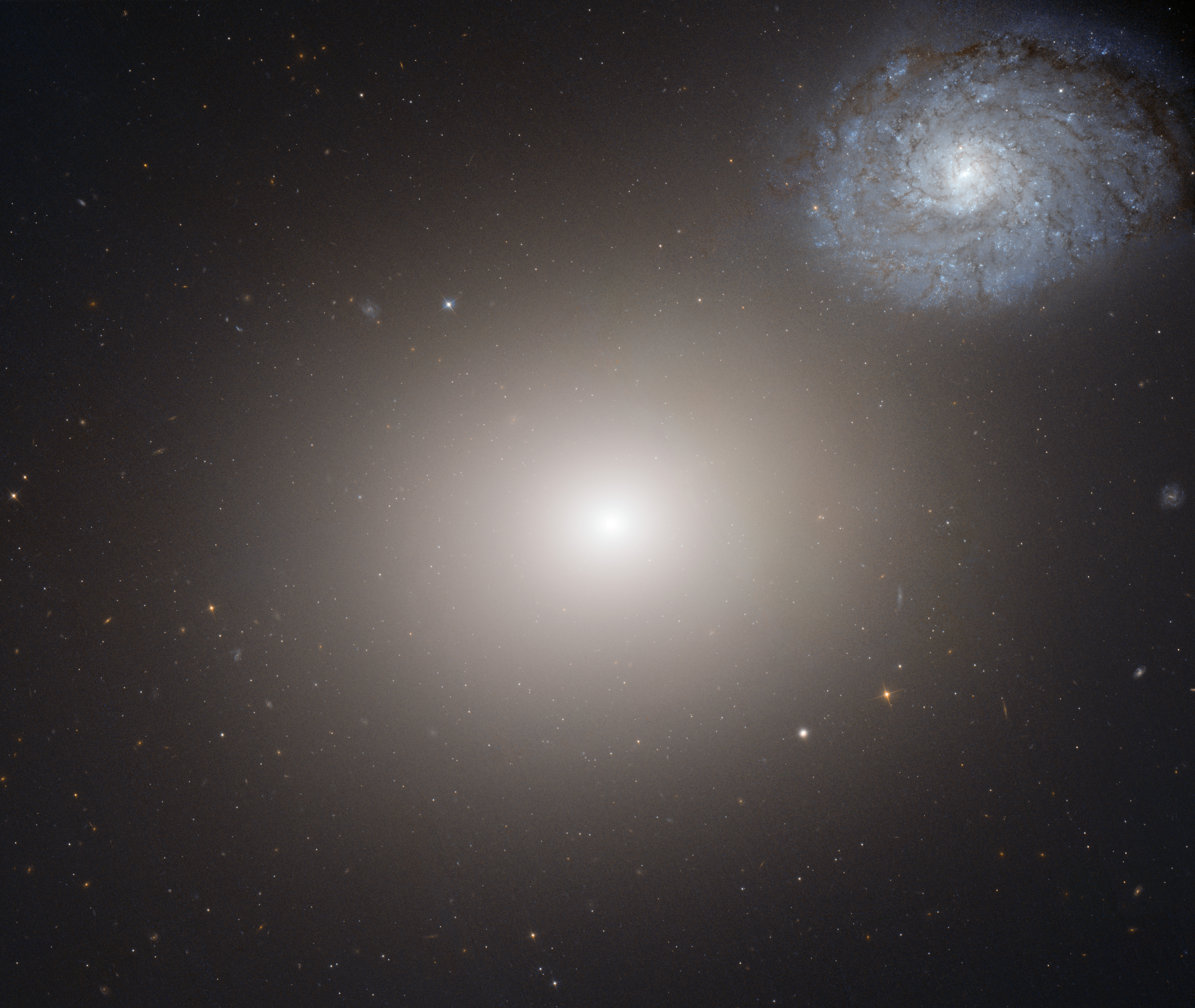
- Hubble Space Telescope image of Arp 116 composed of Messier 60 and NGC 4647, including the ultra-compact dwarf galaxy M60-UCD1 near the bottom

Observation data (J2000 epoch)
- Constellation: Virgo
- Right ascension: 12^{h} 43^{m} 40.008^{s}
- Declination: +11° 33′ 09.40″
- Redshift: 0.003726
- Heliocentric radial velocity: 1,108 km/s
- Distance: 56.7 Mly (17.38 Mpc)
- Group or cluster: Virgo Cluster
- Apparent magnitude (V): 8.8

Characteristics
- Type: E1.5 or S0
- Apparent size (V): 7.4′ × 6.0′

Other designations
- M60, NGC 4649, PGC 42831, UGC 7898.

Messier 60 or M60, also known as NGC 4649, is an elliptical galaxy approximately 57 million light-years away in the equatorial constellation of Virgo. Together with NGC 4647, it forms a pair known as Arp 116. Messier 60 and nearby elliptical galaxy Messier 59 were discovered by Johann Gottfried Koehler in April 1779, observing a comet in the same part of the sky. Charles Messier added both to his catalogue about three days after this.

== Characteristics ==
M60 is an elliptical galaxy of type E1 1/2 (E1.5), although some sources class it as S0 – a lenticular galaxy. An E2 class indicates a flattening of 20%, which has a nearly round appearance. The isophotes of the galaxy are boxy in shape, rather than simple ellipses. The mass-to-light ratio is a near constant 9.5 in the V (visual) band of the UBV system. The galaxy has an effective radius of 128″ (translating, at its distance, to about 10 kpc), with an estimated mass of ~10^{12} M_{☉} within a threefold volume, of which nearly half is dark matter. The mass estimated from X-ray emission is (1.0±0.1)×10^{12} M_{☉} within 5 effective radii.

=== Supermassive black hole ===
At the center of M60 is a supermassive black hole (SMBH) of 4.5±1.0 billion solar masses, one of the largest ever found. It is currently inactive. X-ray emission from the galaxy shows a cavity created by jets emitted by the hole during past active periods, which correspond to weak radio lobes. The power needed to generate these features is in the range (6–7)×10^{41} erg·s^{−1} (ergs per second).

== Supernova ==
One supernova has been observed in Messier 60:

- SN 2004W (Type Ia-pec, mag. 18.8) was discovered by the Lick Observatory Supernova Search (LOSS) on 28 January 2004. It was located 51.6″ west and 78.7″ south of the nucleus.

== Environment ==
M60 is the third-brightest giant elliptical galaxy of the Virgo cluster of galaxies, and is the dominant member of a subcluster of four galaxies, the M60 group, which is the closest-known isolated compact group of galaxies. It has several satellite galaxies, one of them being the ultracompact dwarf galaxy M60-UCD1, discovered in 2013. The motion of M60 through the intercluster medium is resulting in ram-pressure stripping of gas from the galaxy's outer halo, beyond a radius of 12 kpc.

NGC 4647 appears approximately 2.5′ from Messier 60; the optical disks of the two galaxies overlap. Although this overlap suggests that the galaxies are interacting, photographic images of the two galaxies do not reveal any evidence for gravitational interactions between the two galaxies as would be suggested if the two galaxies were physically close to each other. This suggests that the galaxies are at different distances and are only weakly interacting if at all. However, studies with the Hubble Space Telescope show indications that a tidal interaction may have just begun.

== Recession speed and distance estimations ==
Messier 60 was the fastest-moving galaxy included in Edwin Hubble's landmark 1929 paper concerning the relationship between recession speed and distance. He used a value of 1090 km/s for the recession speed, 1.8% less than the more recent value of about 1110 km/s (based on a redshift of 0.003726). But he estimated the distance of this galaxy as well as of the three nebulas of the Virgo Cluster which he included (Messier 85, 49, and 87), to be only two million parsecs, rather than the accepted value today of around 16 million parsecs. These errors in distance led him to propose a Hubble constant of 500 km/s/Mpc, whereas the present estimate is around 70 km/s/Mpc.

== Gallery ==
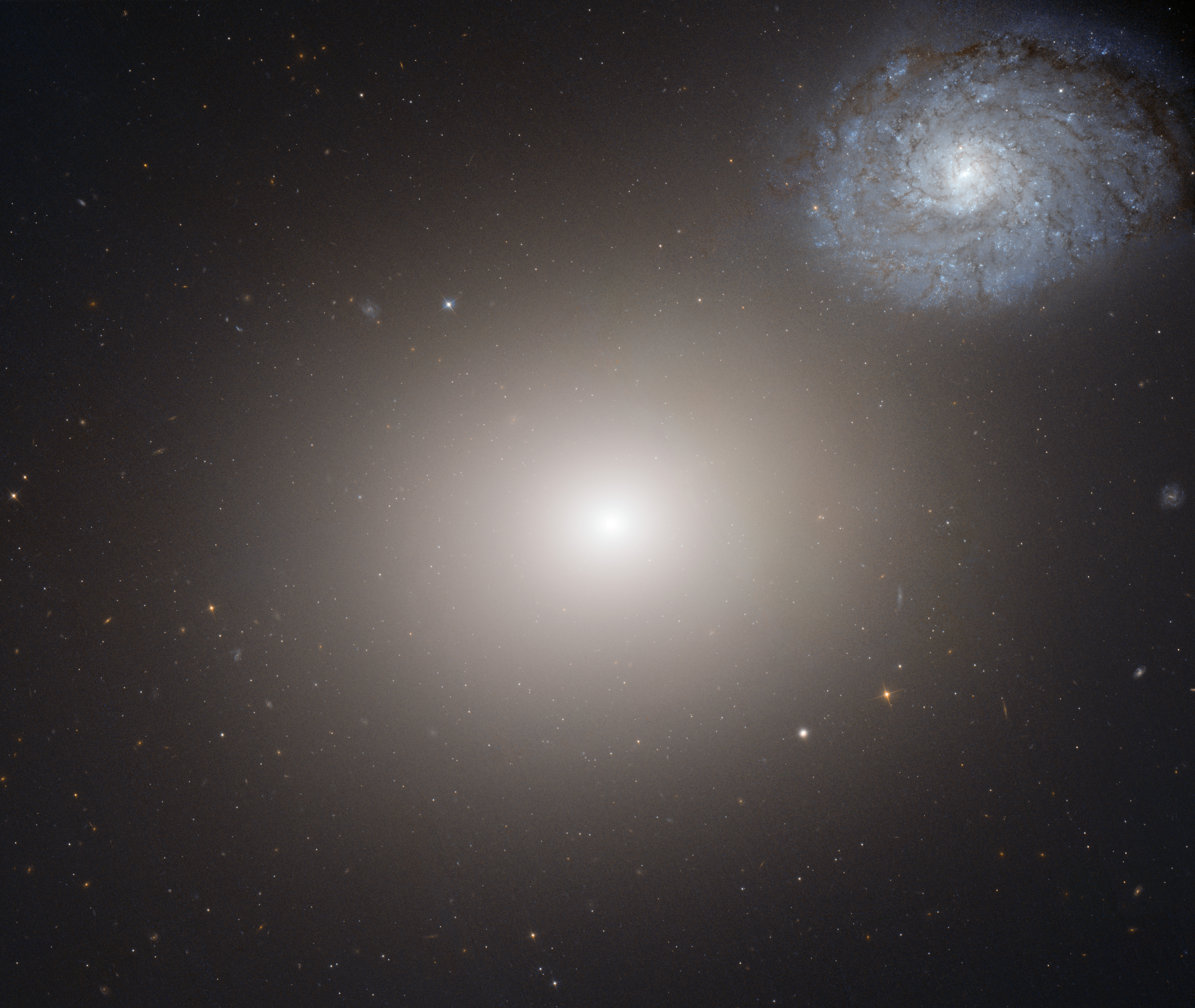
Arp 116 is composed of a giant elliptical galaxy known as Messier 60, and a much smaller spiral galaxy, NGC 4647.

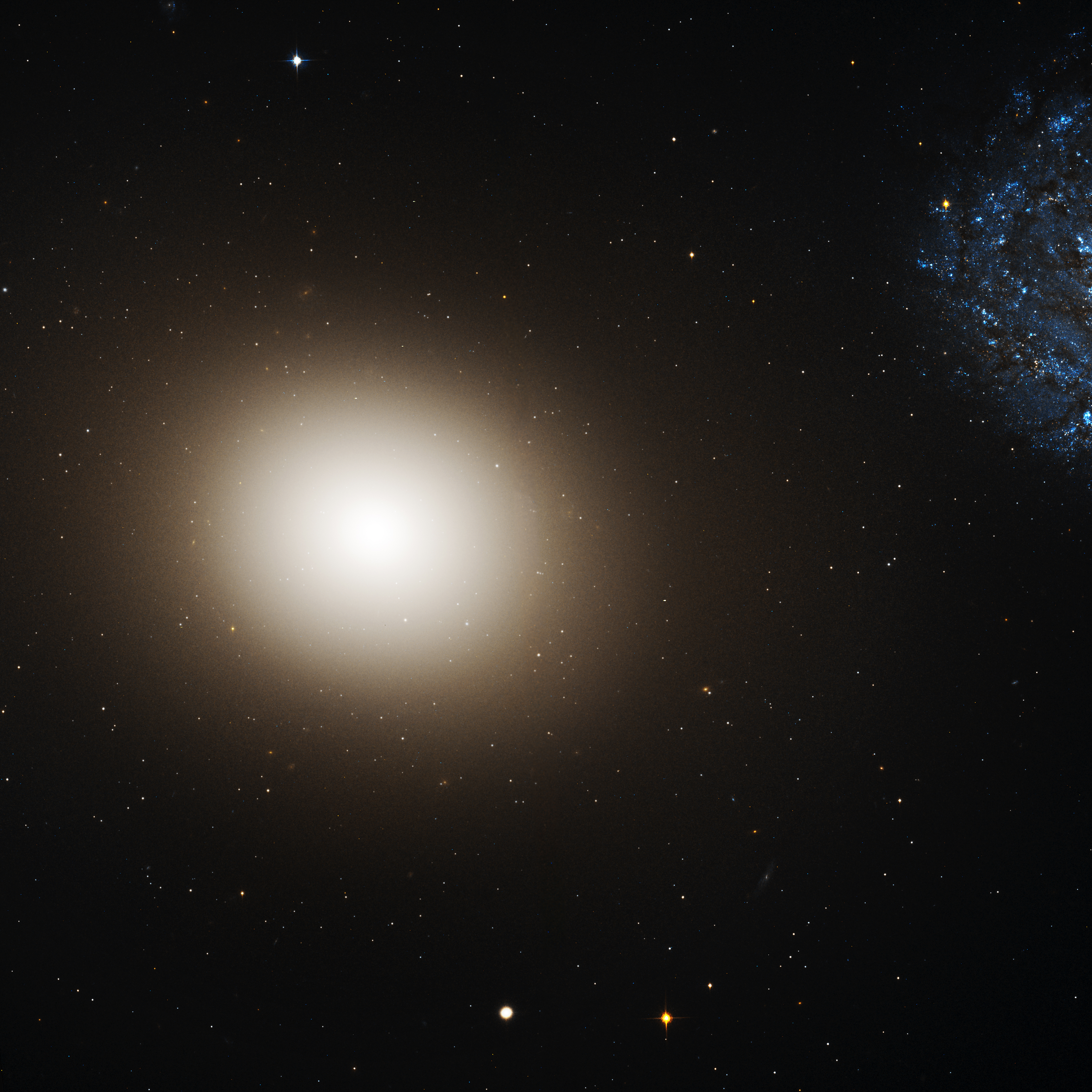
M60 and the region around it, including the ultra-compact dwarf galaxy M60-UCD1 near the bottom

== See also ==
- List of Messier objects
- NGC 7318
- M60-UCD1
- NGC 4647
- Virgo Cluster
