= 10 Andromedae =

Star in the constellation Andromeda

- Location of 10 Andromedae (circled)

Observation data Epoch J2000 Equinox ICRS
- Constellation: Andromeda
- Right ascension: 23^{h} 19^{m} 52.42538^{s}
- Declination: +42° 04′ 41.0516″
- Apparent magnitude (V): 5.81

Characteristics
- Evolutionary stage: red giant branch
- Spectral type: M0 III
- B−V color index: 1.512±0.007

Astrometry
| Radial velocity (R_{v}) | −1.1±0.3 km/s |
| Proper motion (μ) | RA: +42.727 mas/yr Dec.: +6.291 mas/yr |
| Parallax (π) | 6.9444±0.1149 mas |
| Distance | 470 ± 8 ly (144 ± 2 pc) |

Details
| Radius | 33 R_{☉} |
| Luminosity | 258.78 L_{☉} |

Other designations
- 10 And, BD+41°4752, FK5 3870, HD 219981, HIP 115191, HR 8876, SAO 52914, PPM 64085

Database references
| SIMBAD | data |

10 Andromedae, abbreviated 10 And, is an astrometric binary star system in the northern constellation of Andromeda. 10 Andromedae is the Flamsteed designation. It has an apparent visual magnitude of 5.81, which means it is faintly visible to the naked eye. Based upon an annual parallax shift of 6.6 mas, it is located 470 light years away. The system is moving toward the Earth with a heliocentric radial velocity of −1.1 km/s.

The visible component is an aging red giant star with a stellar classification of M0 III, which indicates it has consumed the hydrogen at its core and evolved off the main sequence. The measured angular diameter of this star, after correction for limb darkening, is 2.01±0.02 mas. At the estimated distance of 10 And, this yields a physical size of about 33 times the radius of the Sun. It is radiating 259 times the Sun's luminosity from its enlarged photosphere.
