= 55 Andromedae =

Star in the constellation Andromeda

- Location of 55 Andromedae (circled)

Observation data Epoch J2000 Equinox ICRS
- Constellation: Andromeda
- Right ascension: 01^{h} 53^{m} 17.34433^{s}
- Declination: +40° 43′ 47.2455″
- Apparent magnitude (V): 5.42

Characteristics
- Evolutionary stage: red giant branch
- Spectral type: K1 III
- U−B color index: +1.41
- B−V color index: +1.32

Astrometry
Radial velocity (R_{v})	−7.59±0.2 km/s
Proper motion (μ)	RA: −10.028 mas/yr Dec.: −3.966 mas/yr
Parallax (π)	4.4983±0.0761 mas
Distance	730 ± 10 ly (222 ± 4 pc)
Absolute magnitude (M_{V})	−1.00

Details
Mass	5.0 M_{☉}
Radius	37 R_{☉}
Luminosity	492 L_{☉}
Surface gravity (log g)	1.58 cgs
Temperature	4,348 K
Metallicity [Fe/H]	−0.14 dex
Age	323 Myr

Other designations
- 55 And, BD+40°394, FK5 2124, HD 11428, HIP 8814, HR 543, SAO 37587, PPM 44535, WDS J01533+4044A

Database references
SIMBAD	data

55 Andromedae, abbreviated 55 And, is a single, orange-hued star in the northern constellation of Andromeda. 55 Andromedae is the Flamsteed designation. It is visible to the naked eye with an apparent visual magnitude of 5.42. Based upon an annual parallax shift of 4.5 mas, it is located about 730 light years from the Sun. 55 And is moving closer to the Earth with a heliocentric radial velocity of −7.6 km/s. It is a member of the Sirius supercluster.

This is an aging giant star with a stellar classification of K1 III, which indicates it has exhausted the hydrogen supply at its core and evolved away from the main sequence. It is radiating 492 times the Sun's luminosity from its enlarged photosphere at an effective temperature of 4,348 K. It has a magnitude 10.90 visual companion at an angular separation of 59.00″ along a position angle of 357° from 55 And. In 1828, this separation was just 20.0″.
