= 39 Andromedae =

Double star in the constellation Andromeda

- Location of 39 Andromedae (circled)

Observation data Epoch J2000 Equinox J2000
- Constellation: Andromeda
- Right ascension: 01^{h} 02^{m} 54.25471^{s}
- Declination: +41° 20′ 42.7688″
- Apparent magnitude (V): 5.95

Characteristics
- Evolutionary stage: main sequence
- Spectral type: kA3hA7VmA9
- B−V color index: +0.161±0.009

Astrometry
Radial velocity (R_{v})	+3.1±0.9 km/s
Proper motion (μ)	RA: −18.380 mas/yr Dec.: −18.498 mas/yr
Parallax (π)	9.5651±0.1226 mas
Distance	341 ± 4 ly (105 ± 1 pc)
Absolute magnitude (M_{V})	0.80

Details
Mass	2.01 M_{☉}
Radius	3.02 R_{☉}
Luminosity	37 L_{☉}
Surface gravity (log g)	3.78 cgs
Temperature	8,203 K
Metallicity [Fe/H]	−0.01 dex
Rotation	30.4 days
Rotational velocity (v sin i)	34 km/s
Age	670 Myr

Other designations
- 39 And, BD+40°209, HD 6116, HIP 4903, HR 290, SAO 36874, PPM 43575, WDS J01029+4121A

Database references
SIMBAD	data

39 Andromedae, abbreviated 39 And, is a double star in the northern constellation Andromeda. 39 Andromedae is the Flamsteed designation. Its apparent visual magnitude is 5.95, which indicates it is near the lower limit on visibility to the naked eye. The distance to this star, as estimated from its annual parallax shift of 9.57 mas, is 341 light-years. It is a suspected member of the Ursa Major moving group, although King et al. (2003) list it as a probable non-member.

The brighter component is a confirmed Am star with a stellar classification of kA3hA7VmA9. This notation indicates its spectrum displays the calcium K line of an A3 star, the hydrogen lines of an A7 V, or A-type main-sequence star, and the metal lines of an A9 star. It is radiating 37 times the Sun's luminosity from its photosphere at an effective temperature of 8,203 K. As of 2015, the magnitude 12.48 companion star is located at an angular separation of 20.5″ along a position angle of 3° from the primary.
