= 45 Andromedae =

Double star in the constellation Andromeda

- Location of 45 Andromedae (circled)

Observation data Epoch J2000 Equinox ICRS
- Constellation: Andromeda
- Right ascension: 01^{h} 11^{m} 10.2771^{s}
- Declination: +37° 43′ 26.848″
- Apparent magnitude (V): 5.80

Characteristics
- Evolutionary stage: main sequence
- Spectral type: B7 III-IV
- B−V color index: −0.095±0.004

Astrometry
Radial velocity (R_{v})	−1.5±1.0 km/s
Proper motion (μ)	RA: −15.844 mas/yr Dec.: −5.486 mas/yr
Parallax (π)	4.9479±0.0555 mas
Distance	659 ± 7 ly (202 ± 2 pc)
Absolute magnitude (M_{V})	−1.10

Details
Mass	3.30 M_{☉}
Radius	4.24 R_{☉}
Luminosity	156 L_{☉}
Surface gravity (log g)	3.93 cgs
Temperature	12,078 K
Metallicity [Fe/H]	−0.47 dex
Rotational velocity (v sin i)	60 km/s

Other designations
- 45 And, BD+36°201, HD 7019, HIP 5550, HR 348, SAO 54494, PPM 66038, WDS J01112+3743AB

Database references
SIMBAD	data

45 Andromedae, abbreviated 45 And, is a double star in the northern constellation Andromeda. 45 Andromedae is the Flamsteed designation. Its combined apparent visual magnitude is 5.80. Based upon an annual parallax shift of 4.95 mas, it is located 659 light years away.

The stellar classification of 45 And is B7 III-IV, matching an evolving subgiant/giant star. It has about 4.2 times the Sun's radius and is radiating 156 times the Sun's luminosity from its photosphere at an effective temperature of 12,078 K.

This star is most likely single. A companion star was discovered by American astronomer George W. Hough in 1890. As of 2006, the companion was at an angular separation of 0.10″ along a position angle of 225° from the primary.
