= 4 Andromedae =

Star in the constellation Andromeda

- Location of 4 Andromedae (circled)

Observation data Epoch J2000 Equinox ICRS
- Constellation: Andromeda
- Right ascension: 23^{h} 07^{m} 39.2672^{s}
- Declination: +46° 23′ 14.030″
- Apparent magnitude (V): 5.308

Characteristics
- Evolutionary stage: red giant branch
- Spectral type: K5 III
- B−V color index: 1.436

Astrometry
Radial velocity (R_{v})	−11.89±0.12 km/s
Proper motion (μ)	RA: −12.734 mas/yr Dec.: −30.026 mas/yr
Parallax (π)	9.155±0.0779 mas
Distance	356 ± 3 ly (109.2 ± 0.9 pc)
Absolute magnitude (M_{V})	+0.16

Details
Mass	1.58±0.44 M_{☉}
Radius	23.36±0.59 R_{☉}
Luminosity	170 L_{☉}
Surface gravity (log g)	1.91 cgs
Temperature	4,275±92 K
Metallicity [Fe/H]	1.98±0.11 dex
Age	2.24+0.78 −0.58 Gyr

Other designations
- 4 And, BD+45°4149, FK5 3852, HD 218452, HIP 114200, HR 8804, SAO 52711, PPM 63840, WDS J23077+4623A

Database references
SIMBAD	data

4 Andromedae, abbreviated 4 And, is a single star in the northern constellation of Andromeda. 4 Andromedae is the Flamsteed designation. It is dimly visible to the naked eye with an apparent visual magnitude of 5.308. Based upon an annual parallax shift of 9.16 mas as seen from Earth's orbit, it is located 356 light years away. At this distance, interstellar extinction diminishes the apparent magnitude of 4 And by 0.5326 magnitudes. The star is moving closer with a heliocentric radial velocity of −11 km/s. It has a magnitude 11.7 visual companion at an angular separation of 51.10″ along a position angle of 348°, as of 2002.

At the age of 2.2 billion years, this is an aging giant star with a stellar classification of K5 III, having consumed the hydrogen at its core and evolved away from the main sequence. It has 1.6 times the mass of the Sun and has expanded to 23 times the Sun's radius. The star is radiating 170 times the Sun's luminosity from its enlarged photosphere at an effective temperature of 4,275 K.
