= 18 Andromedae =

Blue-hued star in the constellation Andromeda

- Location of 18 Andromedae (circled)

Observation data Epoch J2000 Equinox J2000
- Constellation: Andromeda
- Right ascension: 23^{h} 39^{m} 08.33166^{s}
- Declination: +50° 28′ 18.2375″
- Apparent magnitude (V): 5.350

Characteristics
- Evolutionary stage: main sequence
- Spectral type: B9 Ve
- B−V color index: −0.110

Astrometry
Radial velocity (R_{v})	+9.9±2.2 km/s
Proper motion (μ)	RA: −17.057 mas/yr Dec.: −2.041 mas/yr
Parallax (π)	7.7914±0.0633 mas
Distance	419 ± 3 ly (128 ± 1 pc)

Details
Mass	3.09±0.06 M_{☉}
Radius	3.61±0.08 R_{☉}
Luminosity	146.6+14.1 −12.9 L_{☉}
Surface gravity (log g)	3.632±0.014 cgs
Temperature	10,351±50 K
Rotational velocity (v sin i)	183 km/s

Other designations
- 18 And, BD+49°4180, FK5 3897, HD 222304, HIP 116709, HR 8967, SAO 35642, PPM 42060

Database references
SIMBAD	data

18 Andromedae, abbreviated 18 And, is a single star in the northern constellation of Andromeda. 18 Andromedae is the Flamsteed designation. It is visible to the naked eye with an apparent visual magnitude of 5.350. The annual parallax shift of 7.8 mas can be used to estimate a distance of 419 light years. It is moving further from the Earth with a heliocentric radial velocity of +10 km/s.

This is a B-type main-sequence star with a stellar classification of B9 Ve, where the 'e' notation indicates this is a Be star. The stellar spectrum of 18 And displays an emission line in the hydrogen Brackett series due to a dense gaseous circumstellar envelope. The star is spinning rapidly with a projected rotational velocity of 183 km/s and has about three times the mass of the Sun. It is radiating 147 times the Sun's luminosity from its photosphere at an effective temperature of 10,351 K. The star has about 3.61 times the radius of the Sun.
