= 41 Andromedae =

Star in the constellation Andromeda

- Location of 41 Andromedae (circled)

Observation data Epoch J2000 Equinox J2000
- Constellation: Andromeda
- Right ascension: 01^{h} 08^{m} 00.85266^{s}
- Declination: +43° 56′ 31.5254″
- Apparent magnitude (V): 5.04

Characteristics
- Spectral type: A2IIIvs (kA2hA6mA6)
- U−B color index: +0.14
- B−V color index: +0.11

Astrometry
Radial velocity (R_{v})	+9.5±0.7 km/s
Proper motion (μ)	RA: +159.581±0.361 mas/yr Dec.: −60.487±0.117 mas/yr
Parallax (π)	16.4320±0.1767 mas
Distance	198 ± 2 ly (60.9 ± 0.7 pc)
Absolute magnitude (M_{V})	1.19

Details
Mass	2.27 M_{☉}
Luminosity	28.53 L_{☉}
Surface gravity (log g)	4.04 cgs
Temperature	8,511 K
Rotational velocity (v sin i)	84 km/s
Age	450 Myr

Other designations
- 41 And, BD+43°234, HD 6658, HIP 5317, HR 324, SAO 36950, PPM 43666

Database references
SIMBAD	data

41 Andromedae is a single star in the northern constellation of Andromeda. 41 Andromedae is the Flamsteed designation. It is bright enough to be faintly visible to the naked eye, having an apparent visual magnitude of 5.04. Based upon an annual parallax shift of 16.4 mas, it is located 198 light years away. The star is moving further from the Earth with a heliocentric radial velocity of +10 km/s and it has a relatively high rate of proper motion, traversing the celestial sphere at the rate of 0.171″ per year.

The stellar classification for this star is A2IIIvs, matching an A-type giant star with narrow (sharp) absorption lines. Abt and Levy (1985) classed it as a kA2hA6mA6 star, which indicates the spectrum has the calcium K line of an A2 star, the hydrogen lines of an A6 star, and the metal lines of an A6 star. It is around 450 million years old and is spinning with a projected rotational velocity of 84 km/s. The star has 2.27 times the mass of the Sun and is radiating 29 times the Sun's luminosity from its photosphere at an effective temperature of 8,511 K.
