= 6 Persei =

Star in the constellation Andromeda

- Location of 6 Persei (circled)

Observation data Epoch J2000 Equinox J2000
- Constellation: Andromeda
- Right ascension: 02^{h} 13^{m} 36.34084^{s}
- Declination: +51° 03′ 56.8222″
- Apparent magnitude (V): 5.29

Characteristics
- Spectral type: G8.5 IIIb Fe-2
- B−V color index: 0.926

Astrometry
Radial velocity (R_{v})	+41.82±0.27 km/s
Proper motion (μ)	RA: +344.397 mas/yr Dec.: −164.853 mas/yr
Parallax (π)	17.8901±0.0943 mas
Distance	182.3 ± 1.0 ly (55.9 ± 0.3 pc)
Absolute magnitude (M_{V})	+1.25±0.07

Orbit
Period (P)	1,576.23±0.04 d
Eccentricity (e)	0.8828±0.0007
Inclination (i)	104°
Periastron epoch (T)	2,450,307.31±0.12 JD
Argument of periastron (ω) (secondary)	266.4±0.3°
Semi-amplitude (K_{1}) (primary)	19.82±0.06 km/s

Details
Mass	1.5 M_{☉}
Radius	7 R_{☉}
Luminosity	26.3 L_{☉}
Surface gravity (log g)	3.0 cgs
Temperature	4,920 K
Metallicity [Fe/H]	−0.60 dex
Rotational velocity (v sin i)	0.0 km/s

Other designations
- NSV 747, AG+50°249, BD+50°481, FK5 77, HD 13530, HIP 10366, HR 645, SAO 23047, PPM 27263, WDS J02136+5104A

Database references
SIMBAD	data

6 Persei is a binary star system in the northern constellation of Andromeda. It is faintly visible to the naked eye with an apparent visual magnitude of 5.29. The system is located 182 light years from Earth, as determined from its annual parallax shift of 17.9 mas. It is moving further away with a heliocentric radial velocity of +42 km/s. The system has a relatively high rate of proper motion, traversing the celestial sphere at the rate of 0.386 arcsecond/year.

This is a single-lined spectroscopic binary with an orbital period of 4.3155 yr and an eccentricity of 0.88. The a sin i value for the primary is 201.8±0.9 Gm, where a is the semimajor axis and i is the orbital inclination. The inclination is estimated to be 104°.

The visible component is an evolved giant star with a stellar classification of G8.5 IIIb Fe-2, where the suffix notation indicates an underabundance of iron in the spectrum. It has 1.5 times the mass of the Sun and has expanded to 7 times the Sun's radius. The star is radiating 26 times the Sun's luminosity from its enlarged photosphere at an effective temperature of 4,920 K. It has a magnitude 10.49 visual companion at an angular separation of 108.9″ along a position angle of 57°, as of 2004.
