= 62 Andromedae =

Star in the constellation Andromeda

- Location of 62 Andromedae (circled)

Observation data Epoch J2000 Equinox ICRS
- Constellation: Andromeda
- Right ascension: 02^{h} 19^{m} 16.79693^{s}
- Declination: +47° 22′ 47.9132″
- Apparent magnitude (V): 5.32

Characteristics
- Evolutionary stage: main sequence
- Spectral type: A0V
- B−V color index: 0.00425

Astrometry
Radial velocity (R_{v})	−29.6±2.8 km/s
Proper motion (μ)	RA: –60.03 mas/yr Dec.: –5.61 mas/yr
Parallax (π)	11.9531±0.1640 mas
Distance	273 ± 4 ly (84 ± 1 pc)
Absolute magnitude (M_{V})	0.93

Details
Mass	2.44 M_{☉}
Radius	2.57 R_{☉}
Luminosity	50 L_{☉}
Surface gravity (log g)	4.01 cgs
Temperature	9,572 K
Rotational velocity (v sin i)	86 km/s

Other designations
- c Andromedae, 62 And, BD+46°552, FK5 1063, HD 14212, HIP 10819, HR 670, SAO 37948, PPM 44986

Database references
SIMBAD	data

62 Andromedae is a single star in the northern constellation Andromeda. 62 Andromedae is the Flamsteed designation, abbreviated 62 And; it also bears the Bayer designation of c Andromedae. It is bright enough to be seen by the naked eye, with an apparent magnitude of 5.31. Based upon parallax measurements made during the Gaia mission, it is at a distance of roughly 273 light-years (84 pc) from Earth. The star is moving closer to the Earth with a heliocentric radial velocity of −30 km/s, and is predicted to come to within 144.6 light-years in 1.6 million years.

This is an A-type main-sequence star with a stellar classification of A0 V. Abt and Morrel (1995) gave it a class of A1 III, matching a more evolved giant star. The star has 2.4 times the mass of the Sun, about 2.6 times the Sun's radius, and is spinning with a projected rotational velocity of 86 km/s. It is radiating 50 times the Sun's luminosity from its photosphere at an effective temperature of 9,572 K. 62 And is about 57% of the way through its main sequence lifetime.
