= 23 Andromedae =

Star in the constellation Andromeda

- Location of 23 Andromedae (circled)

Observation data Epoch J2000 Equinox ICRS
- Constellation: Andromeda
- Right ascension: 00^{h} 13^{m} 30.83999^{s}
- Declination: +41° 02′ 07.3358″
- Apparent magnitude (V): 5.71

Characteristics
- Evolutionary stage: main sequence
- Spectral type: F0 IV
- B−V color index: +0.331±0.004

Astrometry
Radial velocity (R_{v})	−27.1±1.2 km/s
Proper motion (μ)	RA: −123.558 mas/yr Dec.: −146.479 mas/yr
Parallax (π)	26.8715±0.0403 mas
Distance	121.4 ± 0.2 ly (37.21 ± 0.06 pc)
Absolute magnitude (M_{V})	+3.01

Details
Mass	1.51 M_{☉}
Radius	1.66 R_{☉}
Luminosity	5.7 L_{☉}
Surface gravity (log g)	4.17 cgs
Temperature	6,921 K
Metallicity [Fe/H]	−0.13±0.07 dex
Rotational velocity (v sin i)	36 km/s
Age	2.2 Gyr

Other designations
- 23 And, BD+40°29, FK5 2010, HD 905, HIP 1086, HR 41, SAO 36173, PPM 42707

Database references
SIMBAD	data

23 Andromedae, abbreviated 23 And, is a presumed single star in the constellation Andromeda, although it has been a suspected spectroscopic binary. 23 Andromedae is the Flamsteed designation. Its apparent visual magnitude is 5.71, which indicates it is dimly visible to the naked eye under good viewing conditions. The distance to 23 And, as determined from its annual parallax shift of 26.9 mas, is 121.4 light-years. The star is moving further from the Earth with a heliocentric radial velocity of −27 km/s. It has a relatively high proper motion, traversing the celestial sphere at the rate of 0.191″ per year.

The stellar classification of 23 And is F0 IV, matching an F-type subgiant star that is in the process of evolving into a red giant. It displays a slight microvariability with a frequency of 0.85784 d^{−1} and an amplitude of 0.0062 magnitude. The star is around 2.2 billion years old with a projected rotational velocity of 36 km/s. It has 1.51 times the mass of the Sun and is radiating 5.7 times the Sun's luminosity from its photosphere at an effective temperature of 6,921 K.
