= 28 Andromedae =

Star in the constellation Andromeda

- Location of 28 Andromedae (circled)

Observation data Epoch J2000 Equinox ICRS
- Constellation: Andromeda
- Right ascension: 00^{h} 30^{m} 07.36^{s}
- Declination: +29° 45′ 05.6″
- Apparent magnitude (V): 5.214

Characteristics
- Spectral type: A7 III
- U−B color index: +0.08
- B−V color index: +0.26
- Variable type: δ Sct

Astrometry
Radial velocity (R_{v})	−10.3±0.6 km/s
Proper motion (μ)	RA: 44.983±0.344 mas/yr Dec.: 55.668±0.176 mas/yr
Parallax (π)	16.3540±0.1743 mas
Distance	199 ± 2 ly (61.1 ± 0.7 pc)
Absolute magnitude (M_{V})	1.29

Details
Mass	1.77 M_{☉}
Radius	3.19 R_{☉}
Luminosity	25.007 L_{☉}
Surface gravity (log g)	3.95±0.06 cgs
Temperature	7,335±69 K
Metallicity [Fe/H]	−0.09±0.05 dex
Rotational velocity (v sin i)	21±2 km/s
Age	1.159 Gyr

Other designations
- BD+28°75, HD 2628, HIP 2355, HR 114, SAO 74041, PPM 89834

Database references
SIMBAD	data

28 Andromedae (abbreviated 28 And) is a Delta Scuti variable star in the constellation Andromeda. 28 Andromedae is the Flamsteed designation. It also bears the variable star name GN Andromedae. Its apparent magnitude is 5.214, varying by less than 0.1 magnitudes.

== Description ==
28 Andromedae is an A-type giant star, meaning it is colored bluish-white. Parallax estimates made by the Hipparcos spacecraft put the star at a distance of about 199 light years (61 parsecs). It is moving towards the solar system at a velocity of 10.30 km/s.

== Multiplicity of the system ==
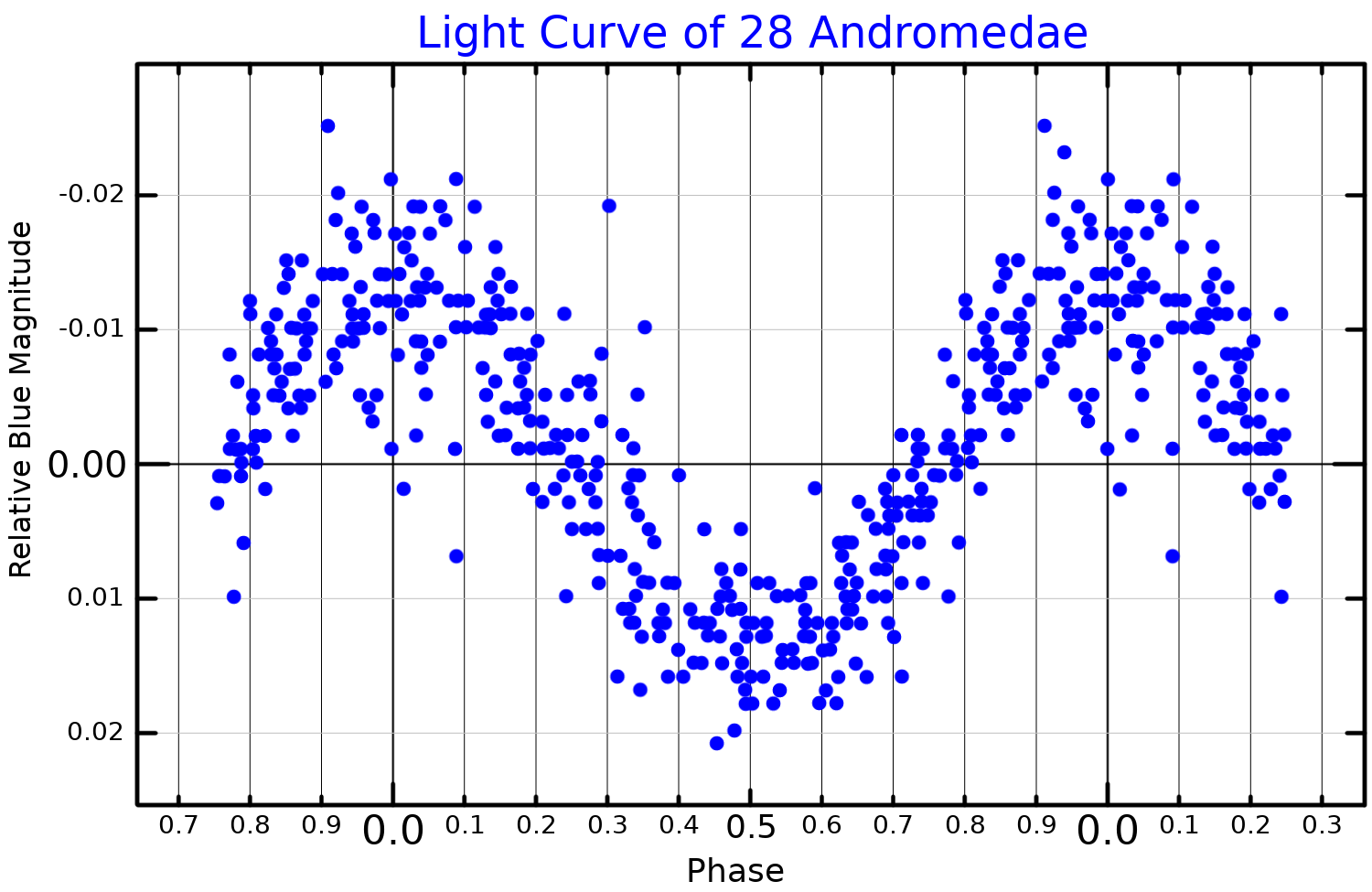
The blue band light curve, normalized to zero mean, of 28 Andromedae, adapted from Garrido et al.

Two stars near 28 Andromedae share a common proper motion with the primary star, which is then a candidate triple system. The orbital parameters are currently unknown. The second and third component have masses of 0.71 M_{☉} and 0.14 M_{☉} respectively.

== Variability cycle ==
28 Andromedae A is a Delta Scuti variable, so it displays small luminosity variations at timescales less than a day due to star pulsation. There is evidence for two periodic cycles of 5,014 and 5,900 seconds, respectively. The amplitude variations, though, are not constant in time, and the pulsation modes are not radial.
