= 36 Andromedae =

Binary star system in the constellation Andromeda

- Location of 36 Andromedae (circled)

Observation data Epoch J2000 Equinox ICRS
- Constellation: Andromeda
- 36 Andromedae A
- Right ascension: 00^{h} 54^{m} 58.25579^{s}
- Declination: +23° 37′ 41.3002″
- Apparent magnitude (V): 6.12, 5.45 (A + B)
- 36 Andromedae B
- Right ascension: 00^{h} 54^{m} 58.21490^{s}
- Declination: +23° 37′ 42.2805″
- Apparent magnitude (V): 6.54

Characteristics
- Spectral type: G8 IV + K3 IV
- B−V color index: 1.012±0.010

Astrometry
Radial velocity (R_{v})	−0.84±0.12 km/s
Proper motion (μ)	RA: 135.43±1.00 mas/yr Dec.: −48.61±0.48 mas/yr
Parallax (π)	26.33±0.65 mas
Distance	124 ± 3 ly (38.0 ± 0.9 pc)
Absolute magnitude (M_{V})	2.56

Orbit
Primary	36 And A
Name	36 And B
Period (P)	169.08±0.37 yr
Semi-major axis (a)	0.9847″±0.0017″ (37 AU) (Note: Calculated from angular separation of 0.9847″ and distance of 38.0 parsecs.)
Eccentricity (e)	0.3092±0.0014
Inclination (i)	44.80±0.18°
Longitude of the node (Ω)	173.60±0.32°
Periastron epoch (T)	1956.23±0.17
Argument of periastron (ω) (secondary)	359.0±0.6°

Details

36 And A
Mass	1.45 M_{☉}
Radius	3.71 R_{☉}
Luminosity	7.75 L_{☉}
Temperature	5,000 K

36 And B
Mass	1.34 M_{☉}

Other designations
- 36 And, NSV 343, BD+22°146, HD 5286, HIP 4288, HR 258, SAO 74359, PPM 90284, ADS 755, WDS J00550+2338AB

Database references
SIMBAD	system
- 36 Andromedae A
- 36 Andromedae B

36 Andromedae is a binary star system in the northern constellation of Andromeda, which is part of a triple star system. The designation is from the star catalogue of English astronomer John Flamsteed, first published in 1712. It is faintly visible to the naked eye with an apparent visual magnitude of 5.45. An annual parallax shift of 26.33 mas yields a distance estimate of about 124 light years. The system is moving closer to the Sun with a radial velocity of −0.8 km/s.

== Characteristics ==
The binary nature of 36 Andromedae was discovered in 1832 by the German-Russian astronomer Wilhelm von Struve. It is a wide binary with an orbital period of 169.1 years and an eccentricity of 0.31. Their semi-major axis is of 37 astronomical units (au), larger than that of Neptune. As of 2016, the pair had an angular separation of 0.90 arc seconds along a position angle of 330°.

The primary, component A, is a magnitude 6.12 G-type star with a stellar classification of G8 IV, while the secondary, component B, has a magnitude of 6.54 and is a K-type star of class K3 IV. Their brightness compared to their temperatures indicate they are evolving subgiant stars. However, at least one of the components is subject to flare activity, which may suggest they are instead pre-main sequence stars.

36 Andromedae makes part of a triple star system. A third star, which shares a common proper motion with the inner pair and hence is believed to form a triple system, is separated by the AB pair by 1,407" (0.39°). At the system's distance, this implies a projected separation of 53,000 astronomical units (0.84 light-years) (Note: Calculated from angular separation of 1,407″ and distance of 38.0 parsecs.) and an estimated orbital period of seven million years. It is a K-type main-sequence star with 0.68 times the mass of the Sun and an apparent magnitude of 10.92.
