= 58 Andromedae =

Star in the constellation Andromeda

- Location of 58 Andromedae (circled)

Observation data Epoch J2000 Equinox ICRS
- Constellation: Andromeda
- Right ascension: 02^{h} 08^{m} 29.25999^{s}
- Declination: +37° 51′ 32.6861″
- Apparent magnitude (V): 4.78

Characteristics
- Evolutionary stage: main sequence
- Spectral type: A5 IV-V
- B−V color index: 0.120±0.003

Astrometry
Radial velocity (R_{v})	7.60±1.78 km/s
Proper motion (μ)	RA: +154.296 mas/yr Dec.: −43.304 mas/yr
Parallax (π)	17.5326±0.2911 mas
Distance	186 ± 3 ly (57.0 ± 0.9 pc)
Absolute magnitude (M_{V})	0.94

Details
Mass	2.00 M_{☉}
Radius	1.9 R_{☉}
Luminosity	35.55 L_{☉}
Surface gravity (log g)	3.89±0.14 cgs
Temperature	8,875±302 K
Metallicity [Fe/H]	−0.98 dex
Rotational velocity (v sin i)	135 km/s
Age	425 Myr

Other designations
- 58 And, BD+37°486, HD 13041, HIP 9977, HR 620, SAO 55289, PPM 66995

Database references
SIMBAD	data

58 Andromedae, abbreviated 58 And, is a single star in the northern constellation Andromeda. 58 Andromedae is the Flamsteed designation. It is visible to the naked eye with an apparent visual magnitude of 4.78 The distance to this star, as determined from its annual parallax shift of 17.5 mas, is 186 light years. 58 And is moving further from the Earth with a heliocentric radial velocity of +8 km/s. It has a relatively high proper motion, traversing the celestial sphere at the rate of 0.159″ per year.

This star is 425 million years old with a stellar classification of A5 IV-V, indicating the spectrum displays mixed traits of an A-type main-sequence star and an older subgiant star. It is spinning rapidly with a projected rotational velocity of 135 km/s, which is giving the star an oblate shape with an equatorial bulge that is 6% larger than the polar radius. The star has double the mass of the Sun and about 1.9 times the Sun's radius. It is radiating 36 times the Sun's luminosity from its photosphere at an effective temperature of 8,875 K.
