= 5 Andromedae =

Star in the constellation Andromeda

- Location of 5 Andromedae (circled)

Observation data Epoch J2000 Equinox ICRS
- Constellation: Andromeda
- Right ascension: 23^{h} 07^{m} 45.38355^{s}
- Declination: +49° 17′ 44.7904″
- Apparent magnitude (V): 5.68

Characteristics
- Evolutionary stage: Main sequence
- Spectral type: F5 V
- B−V color index: 0.449±0.003

Astrometry
Radial velocity (R_{v})	−2.6±0.3 km/s
Proper motion (μ)	RA: 151.592±0.034 mas/yr Dec.: 131.723±0.031 mas/yr
Parallax (π)	29.0956±0.0408 mas
Distance	112.1 ± 0.2 ly (34.37 ± 0.05 pc)
Absolute magnitude (M_{V})	3.00

Details
Mass	1.386+0.010 −0.009 M_{☉}
Radius	1.741 R_{☉}
Luminosity	5.62 L_{☉}
Surface gravity (log g)	4.12±0.02 cgs
Temperature	6,605±61 K
Metallicity [Fe/H]	−0.09±0.05 dex
Rotational velocity (v sin i)	9.7 km/s
Age	2.28+0.12 −0.25 Gyr

Other designations
- 5 And, BD+48°3944, FK5 1604, HD 218470, HIP 114210, HR 8805, SAO 52713, PPM 63843

Database references
SIMBAD	data

5 Andromedae is a single, yellow-white hued star in the northern constellation of Andromeda, abbreviated 5 And. Its designation comes from a catalogue of stars by English astronomer John Flamsteed, published in 1712. The star is faintly visible to the naked eye, having an apparent visual magnitude of 5.68. Based upon an annual parallax shift of 29.1 mas as seen from Earth, it is located 112 light years away. 5 Andromedae is moving closer to the Sun with a radial velocity of −2.6 km/s. It has a relatively high proper motion, advancing across the celestial sphere at the rate of 0.201 arc seconds per year.

This is an ordinary F-type main-sequence star with a stellar classification of F5 V. It is estimated to be 2.3 billion years old and is spinning with a projected rotational velocity of 9.7 km/s. The star has 1.39 times the mass of the Sun and 1.74 times the Sun's radius. It is radiating 5.6 times the Sun's luminosity from its photosphere at an effective temperature of about 6,605 K.

Within Andromeda it is the second of a northerly chain asterism – 7, 8, 11 are further south-westward, with 3 Andromedae in the other direction.
