= 7 Andromedae =

Star in the constellation Andromeda

- Location of 7 Andromedae (circled)

Observation data Epoch J2000 Equinox ICRS
- Constellation: Andromeda
- Right ascension: 23^{h} 12^{m} 33.00351^{s}
- Declination: +49° 24′ 22.3459″
- Apparent magnitude (V): 4.52

Characteristics
- Evolutionary stage: Main sequence
- Spectral type: F1V
- U−B color index: +0.01

Astrometry
Radial velocity (R_{v})	12.10±1 km/s
Proper motion (μ)	RA: 89.939±0.114 mas/yr Dec.: 95.704±0.107 mas/yr
Parallax (π)	40.2940±0.1130 mas
Distance	80.9 ± 0.2 ly (24.82 ± 0.07 pc)
Absolute magnitude (M_{V})	2.58

Details
Mass	1.6±0.1 M_{☉}
Radius	1.71±0.02 R_{☉}
Luminosity	7.8±0.6 L_{☉}
Surface gravity (log g)	4.16±0.02 cgs
Temperature	7,380±90 K
Metallicity [Fe/H]	−0.02±0.08 dex
Rotational velocity (v sin i)	61±6 km/s
Age	1,120±30 Myr

Other designations
- Honores, 7 And, BD+48°3964, FK5 3852, HD 219080, HIP 114570, HR 8830, SAO 52787, PPM 63927

Database references
SIMBAD	data

7 Andromedae, also named Honores, is a single, yellow-white hued star in the northern constellation of Andromeda. 7 Andromedae is the Flamsteed designation, abbreviated 7 And. It is visible to the naked eye with an apparent visual magnitude of 4.52, and is located 80.9 light years from Earth, based on an annual parallax shift of 40.3 mas. The star is moving further from the Sun with a heliocentric radial velocity of 12 km/s.

This is an ordinary F-type main-sequence star with a stellar classification of F1V, which indicates it is generating energy from hydrogen fusion at its core. This energy is being radiated from its photosphere at the rate of 7.8 times the Sun's luminosity with an effective temperature of 7,380 K. The star has 1.6 times the mass of the Sun and 1.7 times the Sun's girth. 7 Andromedae is 1.1 billion years old and is spinning with a projected rotational velocity of 61 km/s.

Within Andromeda it is at the middle of a northerly chain asterism – 8, 11 are further south-westward, with 5, then 3 Andromedae in the other direction. This star is the closest of these five, all of quite great apparent magnitude.

This star was part of the historical constellation Honores Friderici. The IAU Working Group on Star Names approved the name Honores for 7 Andromedae, on 14 May 2025, after the obsolete constellation, and it is now so entered in the IAU Catalog of Star Names. This star was chosen for the name because it was in the feather part of the constellation, in reference to the proverb "the feather is mightier than the sword".
