= 15 Andromedae =

Star in the constellation Andromeda

- Location of 15 Andromedae (circled)

Observation data Epoch J2000.0 Equinox ICRS
- Constellation: Andromeda
- Right ascension: 23^{h} 34^{m} 37.53683^{s}
- Declination: +40° 14′ 11.1827″
- Apparent magnitude (V): 5.55

Characteristics
- Spectral type: A1 III, A1 Va, or kA1hA3mA0.5 Va+
- B−V color index: 0.096±0.005
- Variable type: δ Sct

Astrometry
Radial velocity (R_{v})	13.1±0.6 km/s
Proper motion (μ)	RA: −18.402±0.060 mas/yr Dec.: −46.401±0.038 mas/yr
Parallax (π)	13.0457±0.0476 mas
Distance	250.0 ± 0.9 ly (76.7 ± 0.3 pc)
Absolute magnitude (M_{V})	+1.16±0.16

Details
Mass	2.7 M_{☉}
Luminosity	27 L_{☉}
Surface gravity (log g)	3.90±0.03 cgs
Temperature	9,225 K
Rotational velocity (v sin i)	105 km/s
Age	130 Myr

Other designations
- 15 And, V340 And, BD+39°5114, FK5 1616, HD 221756, HIP 116354, HR 8947, SAO 73346, PPM 64401

Database references
SIMBAD	data

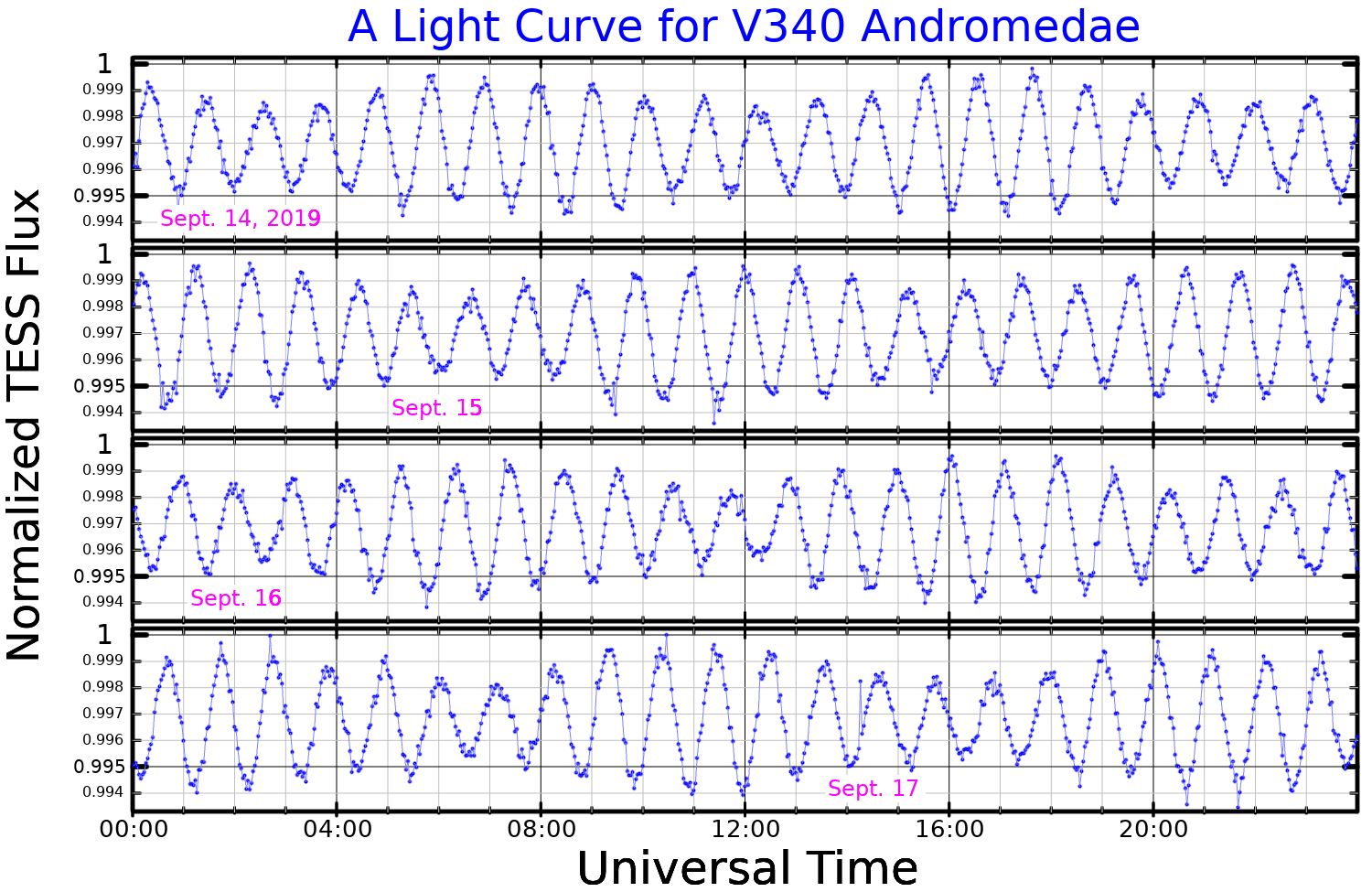
A light curve for V340 Andromedae, plotted from TESS data

15 Andromedae, abbreviated 15 And, is a single, variable star in the northern constellation of Andromeda. 15 Andromedae is the Flamsteed designation, while its variable star designation is V340 And. Its apparent visual magnitude is 5.55, which indicates it is faintly visible to the naked eye. Its estimated distance from the Earth is 250 light years, and it is moving further away with a heliocentric radial velocity of 13 km/s.

Rufener and Bartholdi (1982) included the star (under the name HD 221756) in their list of 333 variable, microvariable and suspected variable stars, based on multicolor photometry performed at several observatories in the 1960s and 1970s. However they were unable to conclusively demonstrate that the star's brightness varied. Proof of variability, along with a light curve and period estimate of 63 minutes, was published by Paunzen and Handler in 1996. The star was given its variable star designation, V340 Andromedae, in 1997.

Depending on the source, this star has been classified as a giant star with a stellar classification of A1 III, an A-type main-sequence star with a class of A1 Va, or a Lambda Boötis star with a class of kA1hA3mA0.5 Va+. It is a Delta Scuti variable that changes in brightness by 0.03 magnitude. Two variability cycles, with periods 0.0403 and 0.0449 days, have been observed, a common feature for Lambda Boötis stars. The star is around 130 million years old and has a high rotation rate, showing a projected rotational velocity of 105 km/s. It has 2.7 times the mass of the Sun and is radiating 27 times the Sun's luminosity from its photosphere at an effective temperature of 9,225 K.

This system has an excess emission of infrared radiation that suggests the presence of an orbiting disk of dust at a distance of around 50 AU from the host star.
