= Rho Andromedae =

Star in the constellation Andromeda

- Location of ρ Andromedae (circled)

Observation data Epoch J2000.0 Equinox J2000.0
- Constellation: Andromeda
- Right ascension: 00^{h} 21^{m} 07.26896^{s}
- Declination: +37° 58′ 06.9727″
- Apparent magnitude (V): +5.19

Characteristics
- Spectral type: F5IV-V
- U−B color index: +0.039
- B−V color index: +0.424

Astrometry
Radial velocity (R_{v})	+10.4±0.6 km/s
Proper motion (μ)	RA: +57.737 mas/yr Dec.: –38.838 mas/yr
Parallax (π)	19.9513±0.0739 mas
Distance	163.5 ± 0.6 ly (50.1 ± 0.2 pc)
Absolute magnitude (M_{V})	+1.73

Details
Mass	1.812±0.024 M_{☉}
Radius	3.234±0.034 R_{☉}
Luminosity	18.672±0.157 L_{☉}
Surface gravity (log g)	3.69±0.04 cgs
Temperature	6,674±34 K
Metallicity [Fe/H]	–0.09±0.03 dex
Rotational velocity (v sin i)	44 km/s
Age	1.3 Gyr

Other designations
- ρ And, 27 Andromedae, BD+37 45, FK5 1009, HD 1671, HIP 1686, HR 82, SAO 53828, PPM 65222

Database references
SIMBAD	data

Rho Andromedae is a star in the northern constellation of Andromeda. Its Bayer designation is Latinized from ρ Andromedae, abbreviated Rho And or ρ And, respectively. The star has an apparent visual magnitude of +5.19, which, according to the Bortle Dark-Sky Scale, is bright enough to be seen with the naked eye from dark suburban skies. Based upon parallax measurements, this star is at a distance of approximately 164 light-years (50 parsecs) from the Sun. It is drifting further away with a radial velocity of +10 km/s.

The stellar classification of this star is F5IV-V, showing mixed spectral features of a main sequence and subgiant stage. It is about 1.3 billion years old and is spinning with a projected rotational velocity of 44 km/s. The star has 1.8 times the mass of the Sun and 3.2 times the Sun's girth. The outer envelope is radiating around 18.7 times the luminosity of the Sun from its photosphere at an effective temperature of 6,674 K, giving it the yellow-white hue of an F-type star. X-ray emissions were detected from this star during the EXOSAT mission.

== Naming ==
In Chinese, 天廄 (Tiān Jiù), meaning Celestial Stable, refers to an asterism consisting of ρ Andromedae, θ Andromedae, σ Andromedae and seven fainter, unidentified stars. Consequently, the Chinese name for ρ Andromedae itself is 天廄二 (Tiān Jiù èr, English: the Second Star of Celestial Stable.)
