= Theta Andromedae =

Binary star in the constellation Andromeda

- Location of θ Andromedae (circled)

Observation data Epoch J2000 Equinox ICRS
- Constellation: Andromeda
- Right ascension: 00^{h} 17^{m} 05.50236^{s}
- Declination: +38° 40′ 53.8886″
- Apparent magnitude (V): 4.61

Characteristics
- Evolutionary stage: main sequence
- Spectral type: A2 V
- U−B color index: +0.05
- B−V color index: +0.06
- Variable type: Constant

Astrometry
Radial velocity (R_{v})	0.9 km/s
Proper motion (μ)	RA: −57.551(307) mas/yr Dec.: −14.795(155) mas/yr
Parallax (π)	18.8747±0.4251 mas
Distance	173 ± 4 ly (53 ± 1 pc)
Absolute magnitude (M_{V})	−0.25

Orbit
Period (P)	1033+91 −77 days
Semi-major axis (a)	25+32 −13 mas
Eccentricity (e)	0.95+0.04 −0.40
Inclination (i)	69+8 −22°
Longitude of the node (Ω)	263+50 −156°
Periastron epoch (T)	238+343 −143
Argument of periastron (ω) (secondary)	89+175 −29°

Details

A
Mass	2.83±0.08 M_{☉}
Luminosity	113 L_{☉}
Surface gravity (log g)	3.95 cgs
Temperature	8,960 K
Metallicity [Fe/H]	+0.14 dex
Rotational velocity (v sin i)	102 km/s

Other designations
- θ And, 24 Andromedae, BD+37°34, HD 1280, HIP 1366, HR 63, SAO 53777, PPM 65154

Database references
SIMBAD	data

Theta Andromedae is a binary star system in the northern constellation of Andromeda. Theta Andromedae, Latinized from θ Andromedae, is its Bayer designation. It is located at a distance of approximately 173 light-years (53 parsecs) from the Sun, and has an apparent visual magnitude of 4.6. On the Bortle Dark-Sky Scale, this makes it visible to the naked eye from outside urban regions. Based on its motion through space, this system appears to be a member of the Sirius supercluster.

The brighter component is a white hued A-type main-sequence star with a stellar classification of A2 V. It is one of the least photometrically variable stars known. The star shows a high rate of rotation with a projected rotational velocity of 102 km/s. It has an estimated 2.8 times the mass of the Sun and is radiating 113 times the Sun's luminosity from its photosphere at an effective temperature of 8,960 K. The relatively high chemical abundances of iron and heavier elements suggests it may be a fast rotating Am star.

A stellar companion was detected in 1986 and reported in 1989. This fainter companion is separated from Theta Andromedae by 0.06 arcseconds. The secondary appears to be a massive, possibly A-type, star orbiting at a distance of around one astronomical unit with a period of 2.83 years and a large orbital eccentricity (ovalness) of 0.95.

== Naming ==
In Chinese, 天廄 (Tiān Jiù), meaning Celestial Stable, refers to an asterism consisting of θ Andromedae, ρ Andromedae and σ Andromedae. Consequently, the Chinese name for θ Andromedae itself is known as 天廄一 (Tiān Jiù yī, English: the First Star of Celestial Stable.)
