= 47 Andromedae =

Binary star system in the constellation Andromeda

- Location of 47 Andromedae (circled)

Observation data Epoch J2000.0 Equinox ICRS
- Constellation: Andromeda
- Right ascension: 01^{h} 23^{m} 40.6163^{s}
- Declination: +37° 42′ 53.799″
- Apparent magnitude (V): 5.60 (6.33 + 6.38)

Characteristics
- Evolutionary stage: main sequence
- Spectral type: A1m (kA1hF1mF2)
- B−V color index: 0.276

Astrometry
Radial velocity (R_{v})	+14.14±0.02 km/s
Proper motion (μ)	RA: +82.131±0.089 mas/yr Dec.: −18.986±0.077 mas/yr
Parallax (π)	15.7619±0.1269 mas
Distance	207 ± 2 ly (63.4 ± 0.5 pc)
Absolute magnitude (M_{V})	2.30±0.06/2.35±0.06

Orbit
Period (P)	35.36836±0.00005 d
Semi-major axis (a)	5.05±0.02 mas
Eccentricity (e)	0.6476±0.0005
Inclination (i)	140.64±0.45°
Periastron epoch (T)	54293.208±0.004 HJD
Semi-amplitude (K_{1}) (primary)	39.27±0.05 km/s
Semi-amplitude (K_{2}) (secondary)	40.47±0.05 km/s

Details

47 And A
Mass	1.636±0.050 M_{☉}
Radius	1.84±0.05 R_{☉}
Luminosity	9.0±0.5 L_{☉}
Surface gravity (log g)	4.16±0.02 cgs
Temperature	7,280±110 K
Rotational velocity (v sin i)	15.9±1.3 km/s
Age	1.0±0.1 Gyr

47 And B
Mass	1.587±0.049 M_{☉}
Radius	1.66±0.12 R_{☉}
Luminosity	8.6±0.5 L_{☉}
Surface gravity (log g)	4.22±0.03 cgs
Temperature	7,280±120 K
Rotational velocity (v sin i)	15.2±1.4 km/s
Age	1.0±0.1 Gyr

Other designations
- 47 And, BD+36°237, FK5 2093, HD 8374, HIP 6514, HR 395, SAO 54655, PPM 66233

Database references
SIMBAD	data

47 Andromedae is a binary star system in the northern constellation of Andromeda. The designation is from the star catalogue of John Flamsteed, first published in 1712. The system has a combined apparent visual magnitude of 5.60, which is just bright enough to be faintly visible to the naked eye under good seeing conditions. The distance to this system, as determined from an annual parallax shift of 15.76 mas, is about 207 light years. It is moving away from the Sun with a heliocentric radial velocity of +14.14 km/s.

The binary nature of this system was discovered by John Stanley Plaskett and Reynold Kenneth Young in 1919 using radial velocity measurements taken from Photographic plates obtained at Dominion Astrophysical Observatory in Saanich, British Columbia, Canada. It is a double-lined spectroscopic binary with an orbital period of 35.4 days and an eccentricity of 0.65. The components appear to be nearly identical Am stars, with a magnitude difference of 0.05. The combined stellar classification is A1m.
