= 6 Andromedae =

Astrometric binary star system in the constellation Andromeda

- Location of 6 Andromedae (circled)

Observation data Epoch J2000 Equinox ICRS
- Constellation: Andromeda
- Right ascension: 23^{h} 10^{m} 27.24121^{s}
- Declination: +43° 32′ 38.5341″
- Apparent magnitude (V): 5.91

Characteristics
- Evolutionary stage: main sequence
- Spectral type: F5 V
- U−B color index: −0.05
- B−V color index: +0.450±0.004

Astrometry
Radial velocity (R_{v})	−32.4±0.7 km/s
Proper motion (μ)	RA: −211.689±0.211 mas/yr Dec.: −144.535±0.234 mas/yr
Parallax (π)	35.5518±0.3115 mas
Distance	91.7 ± 0.8 ly (28.1 ± 0.2 pc)
Absolute magnitude (M_{V})	3.71

Orbit
Period (P)	3,373±6 d
Periastron epoch (T)	53116 ± 16 MJD
Argument of periastron (ω) (secondary)	165.2±2.0°
Semi-amplitude (K_{1}) (primary)	8.75±0.09 km/s

Details
Mass	1.30 M_{☉}
Radius	1.50+0.03 −0.06 R_{☉}
Luminosity	3.090+0.018 −0.017 L_{☉}
Surface gravity (log g)	4.09±0.14 cgs
Temperature	6,425±218 K
Metallicity [Fe/H]	−0.19±0.03 dex
Rotational velocity (v sin i)	18 km/s
Age	2.91 Gyr

Other designations
- 6 And, BD+42°4592, FK5 3857, HD 218804, HIP 114430, HR 8825, SAO 52761, PPM 63896

Database references
SIMBAD	data

6 Andromedae is an astrometric binary star system in the northern constellation of Andromeda. The designation comes from the star catalogue of John Flamsteed, first published in 1712. Its apparent visual magnitude is 5.91, which is just bright enough to be visible to the naked eye under good seeing conditions. Based upon an annual parallax shift of 35.6 mas as seen from Earth, it is 92 light years from the Sun. It is moving closer to the Sun with a radial velocity of −32.4 km/s. The system has a relatively high proper motion, advancing across the celestial sphere at the rate of 0.272 arc seconds per annum.

This is a single-lined spectroscopic binary with an orbital period of 9.2 years and an eccentricity of 0.3. Some early observations of the star gave it a subgiant luminosity class and it was published in the Bright Star Catalogue as spectral class F5 IV. More modern measurements identify the visible component as an F-type main-sequence star with a stellar classification of F5 V. The star is an estimated 2.9 billion years old with 1.3 times the mass of the Sun and 1.5 times the Sun's radius. It is radiating 3.1 times the Sun's luminosity from its photosphere at an effective temperature of around 6,425 K. 6 Andromedae displays an infrared excess at a wavelength of 22 μm, which may indicate a circumstellar disk of warm dusty debris.

The mass of the secondary component is roughly at or above that of the Sun. If it were a single, ordinary star, it should be readily visible as it would be just one magnitude fainter than the primary. The lack of conspicuous ultraviolet emission appears to rule out a white dwarf companion, so it may instead itself be a binary system consisting of two smaller stars having an orbital period between a week and a year.
