= Messier 12 =

Globular cluster in the constellation Ophiuchus

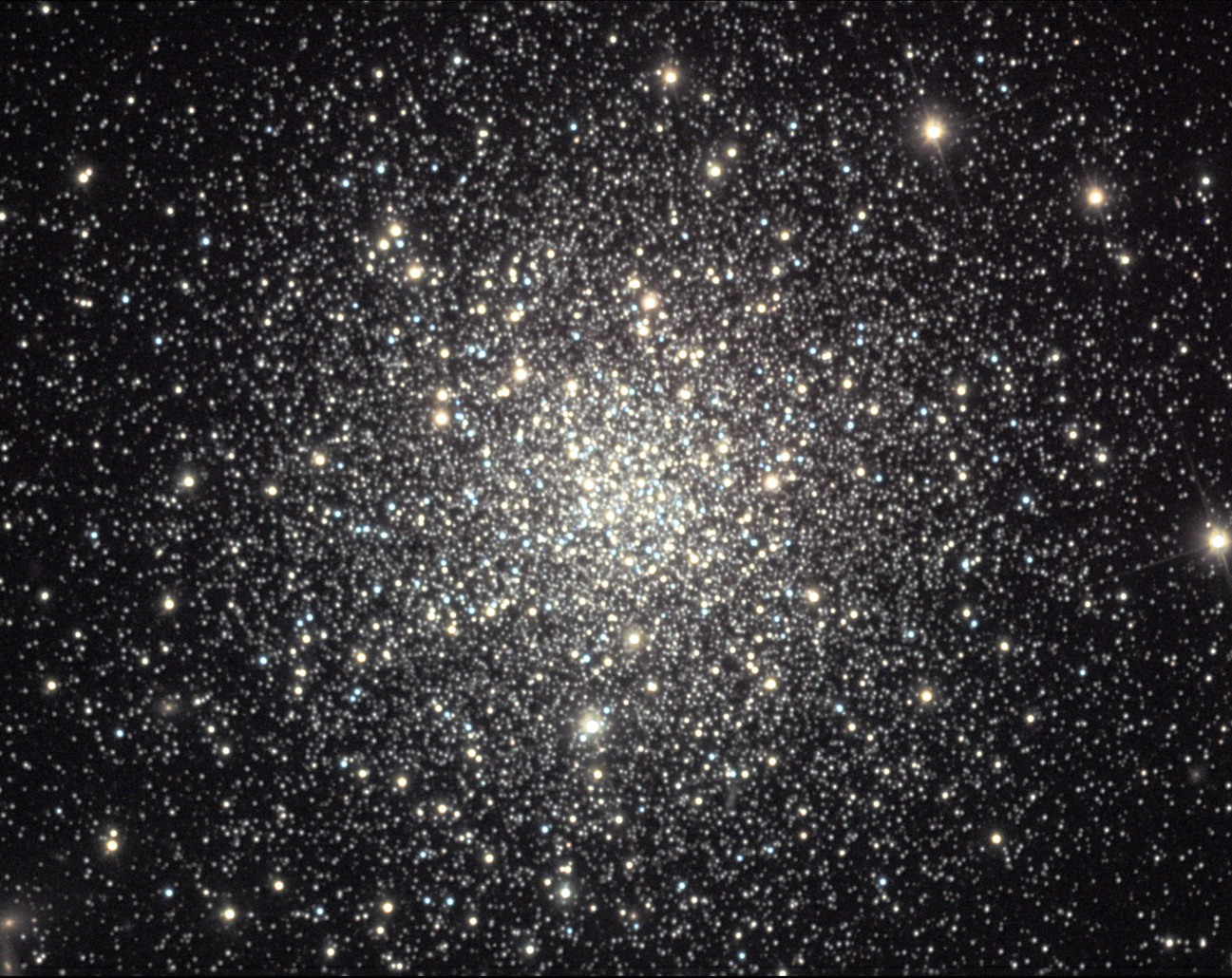
- Globular cluster Messier 12 in Ophiuchus

Observation data (J2000 epoch)
- Class: IX
- Constellation: Ophiuchus
- Right ascension: 16^{h} 47^{m} 14.18^{s}
- Declination: –01° 56′ 54.7″
- Distance: 16.44 ± 0.16 kly (5.04 ± 0.05 kpc)
- Apparent magnitude (V): 6.7
- Apparent dimensions (V): 16.0′

Physical characteristics
- Mass: 8.7×10^{4} M_{☉}
- Radius: 37.2 ly (Note: distance × sin( diameter_angle / 2 ) = 37.2 ly radius)
- Metallicity: [Fe/H] = –1.14 dex
- Estimated age: 13.8 ± 1.1 Gyr
- Other designations: NGC 6218

Messier 12 or M 12 (also designated NGC 6218) is a globular cluster in the constellation of Ophiuchus. It was discovered by the French astronomer Charles Messier on May 30, 1764, who described it as a "nebula without stars". In dark conditions this cluster can be faintly seen with a pair of binoculars. Resolving the stellar components requires a telescope with an aperture of 8 in (20 cm) or greater. In a 10 in (25 cm) scope, the granular core shows a diameter of 3′ (arcminutes) surrounded by a 10′ halo of stars.

M12 is roughly 3° northwest from the cluster M10 and 5.6° east southeast from star Lambda Ophiuchi. It is also located near the 6th magnitude 12 Ophiuchi. The cluster is about 16,400 light-years (5,000 parsecs) from Earth and has a spatial diameter of about 75 light-years. The brightest stars of M12 are of 12th magnitude. M10 and M12 are only a few thousand light-years away from each other and each cluster would appear at about magnitude 4.5 from the other. With a Shapley-Sawyer rating of IX, it is rather loosely packed for a globular and was once thought to be a tightly concentrated open cluster. Thirteen variable stars have been recorded in this cluster. M12 is approaching us at a velocity of 16 km/s.

A study published in 2006 concluded that this cluster has an unusually low number of low-mass stars. The authors surmise that they were stripped from the cluster by passage through the relatively matter-rich plane of the Milky Way.

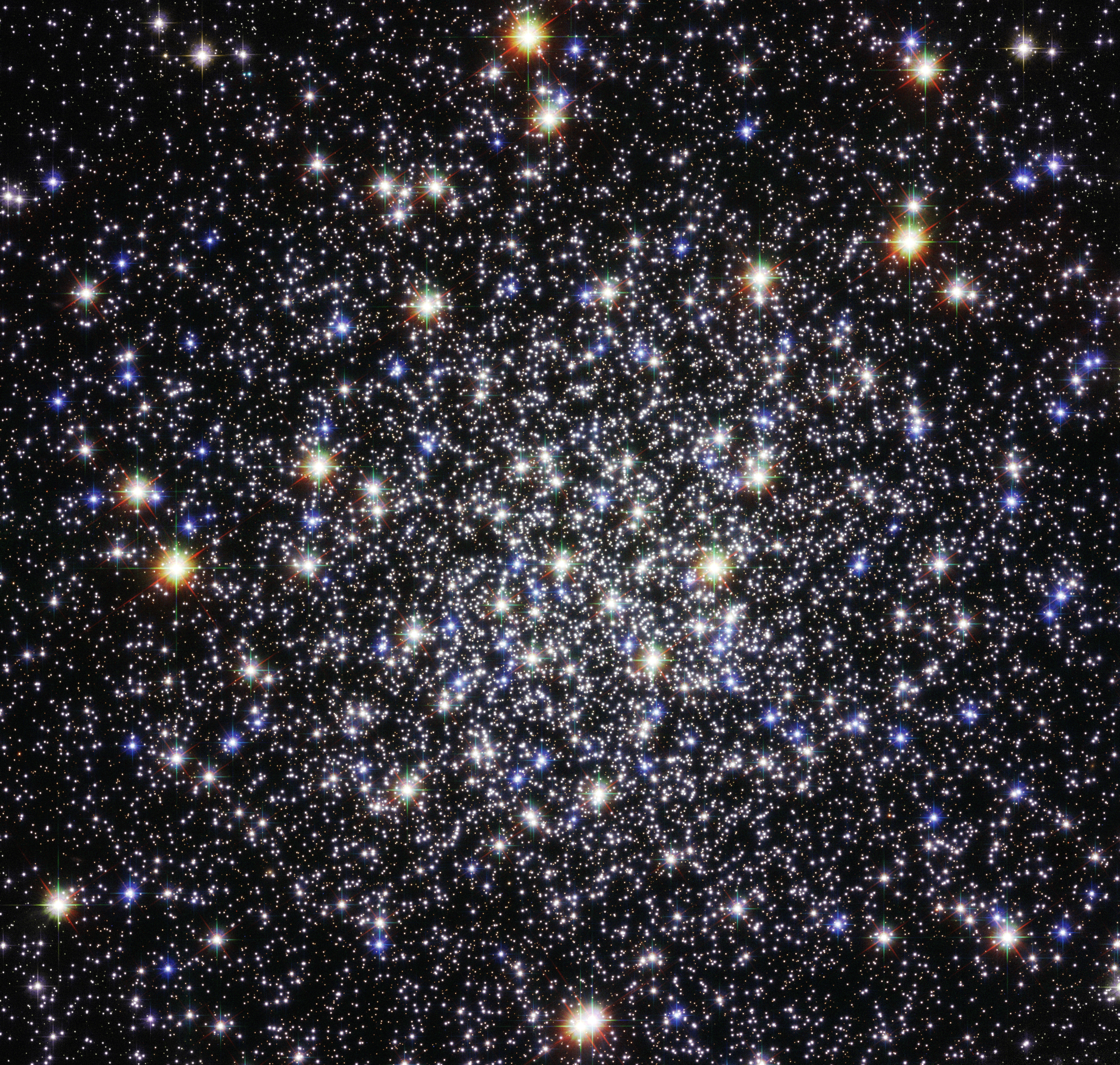
Messier 12 core by HST

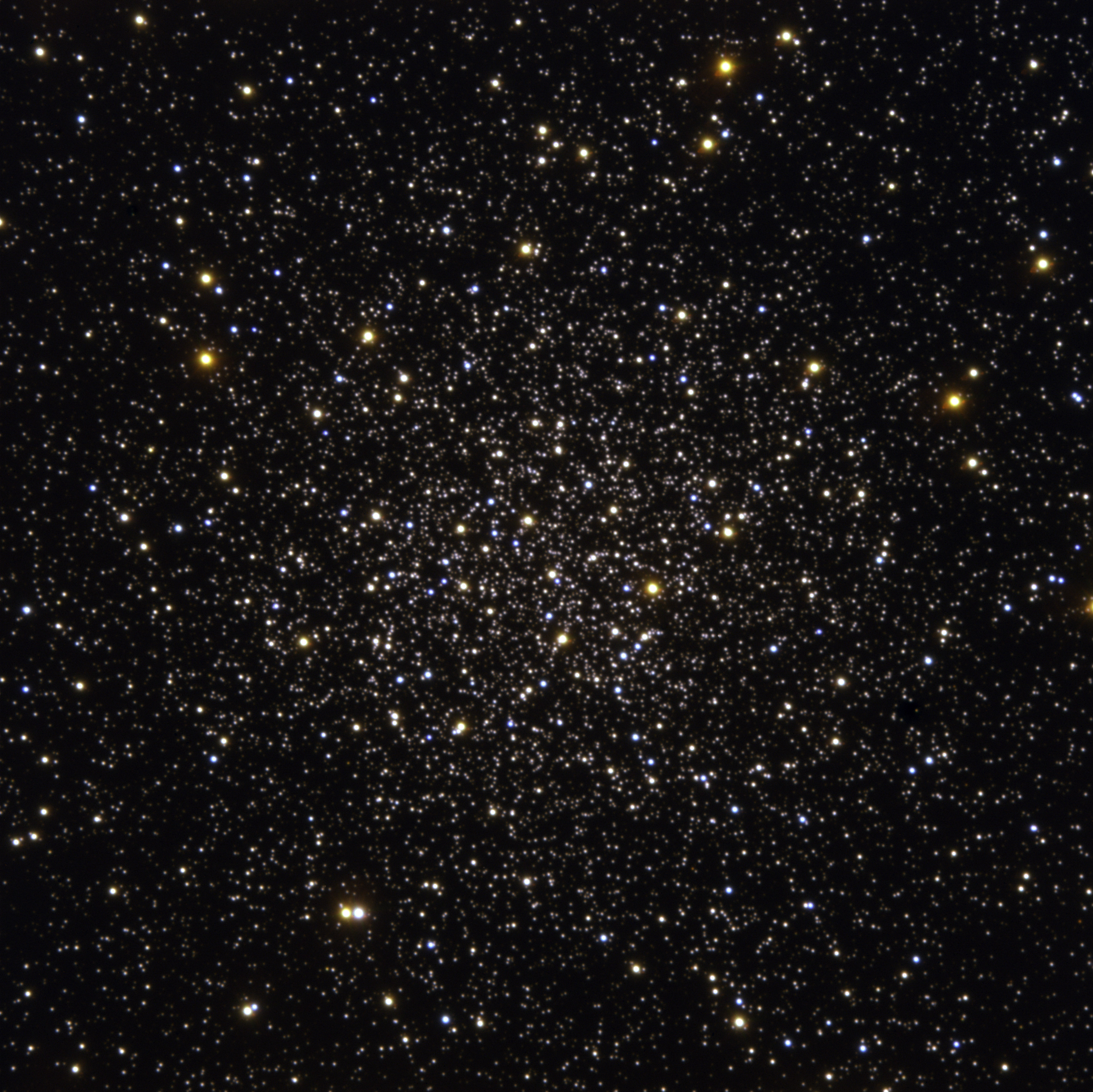
The Central Part of Messier 12. Credit: ESO

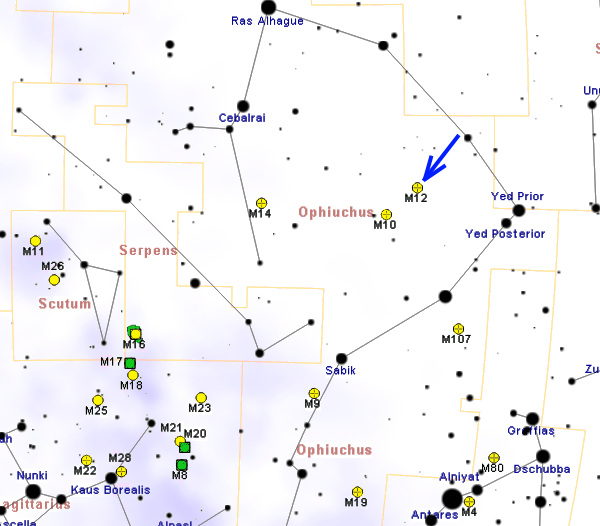
Map showing the location of M12

== See also ==
- List of Messier objects
