= 11 Andromedae =

Star in the constellation Andromeda

- Location of 11 Andromedae (circled)

Observation data Epoch J2000 Equinox ICRS
- Constellation: Andromeda
- Right ascension: 23^{h} 19^{m} 29.80701^{s}
- Declination: +48° 37′ 31.1615″
- Apparent magnitude (V): 5.44

Characteristics
- Spectral type: K0 III
- U−B color index: +0.82
- B−V color index: +1.014±0.003

Astrometry
Radial velocity (R_{v})	+9.99±0.14 km/s
Proper motion (μ)	RA: +22.597 mas/yr Dec.: +52.689 mas/yr
Parallax (π)	11.5097±0.0858 mas
Distance	283 ± 2 ly (86.9 ± 0.6 pc)
Absolute magnitude (M_{V})	0.73

Details
Mass	2.57 M_{☉}
Radius	12 R_{☉}
Luminosity	62.86 L_{☉}
Surface gravity (log g)	2.61 cgs
Temperature	4,874 K
Metallicity [Fe/H]	−0.13±0.07 dex
Rotational velocity (v sin i)	1.0 km/s

Other designations
- 11 And, BD+47°4110, GC 32476, HD 219945, HIP 115152, HR 8874, SAO 52907, PPM 64074

Database references
SIMBAD	data

11 Andromedae, abbreviated 11 And, is a single, orange-hued star in the northern constellation of Andromeda. 11 Andromedae is the Flamsteed designation. It has an apparent visual magnitude of 5.44, which is bright enough to be faintly visible to the naked eye. An annual parallax shift of 11.5 mas yields a distance estimate of 283 light years. It is moving further from the Earth with a heliocentric radial velocity of +10 km/s.

This is an evolved giant star with a stellar classification of K0 III, which means it has exhausted the supply of hydrogen at its core and turned off the main sequence. It has an estimated 2.57 times the mass of the Sun and has expanded to around 12 times the Sun's radius. It is radiating 63 times the Sun's luminosity from its enlarged photosphere at an effective temperature of 4,874 km/s.

Within Andromeda it is the south-west end of a bright northerly chain (jagged line) asterism – the others being, their order going with numbering, 8, 7, 5 and 3 Andromedae.
