= 64 Andromedae =

G-type giant star in the constellation Andromeda

- Location of 64 Andromedae (circled)

Observation data Epoch J2000 Equinox ICRS
- Constellation: Andromeda
- Right ascension: 02^{h} 24^{m} 24.91599^{s}
- Declination: +50° 00′ 23.5560″
- Apparent magnitude (V): 5.19

Characteristics
- Evolutionary stage: red giant branch
- Spectral type: G8III
- U−B color index: +0.753
- B−V color index: +0.973

Astrometry
Radial velocity (R_{v})	–13.63 km/s
Proper motion (μ)	RA: +24.618±0.089 mas/yr Dec.: −36.335±0.117 mas/yr
Parallax (π)	8.0682±0.0972 mas
Distance	404 ± 5 ly (124 ± 1 pc)
Absolute magnitude (M_{V})	−0.25

Details
Mass	3.12±0.19 M_{☉}
Radius	15.90±0.56 R_{☉}
Luminosity	135.6±8.8 L_{☉}
Surface gravity (log g)	2.55±0.05 cgs
Temperature	4,944±33 K
Metallicity [Fe/H]	−0.03±0.10 dex
Rotational velocity (v sin i)	0.69 km/s
Age	350±60 Myr

Other designations
- 64 And, BD+49°649, HD 14770, HIP 11220, HR 694, SAO 38005, PPM 27578

Database references
SIMBAD	data

64 Andromedae, abbreviated 64 And, is a single star in the northern constellation of Andromeda. With a spectral type G8III, it is a deep-yellow coloured G-type giant approximately 404 light years from Earth with an apparent magnitude of 5.19. The star is moving closer to the Earth with a heliocentric radial velocity of –13.6 km/s.

This star is estimated to be 350 million years old with a negligible rotation rate, showing a projected rotational velocity of 0.69 km/s. It has a little more than 3 times the mass of the Sun and has expanded to 16 times the Sun's radius. 64 And is radiating 136 times the luminosity of the Sunfrom its enlarged photosphere at an effective temperature of 4,944 K

== Position and chosen constellation ==
As to the faint triangle and context in which the star figures see 63 Andromedae.
