= 12 Andromedae =

Star in the constellation Andromeda

- Location of 12 Andromedae (circled)

Observation data Epoch J2000 Equinox ICRS
- Constellation: Andromeda
- Right ascension: 23^{h} 20^{m} 53.26361^{s}
- Declination: +38° 10′ 56.3671″
- Apparent magnitude (V): 5.87

Characteristics
- Evolutionary stage: Main sequence
- Spectral type: F5 V
- B−V color index: 0.45

Astrometry
Radial velocity (R_{v})	−10.5±0.3 km/s
Proper motion (μ)	RA: 130.117±0.034 mas/yr Dec.: −58.960±0.033 mas/yr
Parallax (π)	23.7806±0.0361 mas
Distance	137.2 ± 0.2 ly (42.05 ± 0.06 pc)
Absolute magnitude (M_{V})	2.66

Details
Mass	1.25 M_{☉}
Luminosity	7.38 L_{☉}
Surface gravity (log g)	3.92±0.14 cgs
Temperature	6,454±219 K
Metallicity [Fe/H]	+0.00 dex
Rotational velocity (v sin i)	12 km/s
Age	2.548 Gyr

Other designations
- 12 And, BD+37°4817, FK5 1610, HD 220117, HIP 115280, HR 8885, SAO 73190, PPM 88745, WDS J23209+3811A

Database references
SIMBAD	data

12 Andromedae is a single star in the northern constellation of Andromeda. The designation is from the star catalogue of English astronomer John Flamsteed, first published in 1712. It has an apparent visual magnitude of 5.87, which indicates it is just visible to the naked eye under good seeing conditions. An annual parallax shift of 23.7806 mas provides a distance estimate of 137 light years. The star is moving closer to the Sun with a radial velocity of −10.5 km/s.

This is an ordinary F-type main-sequence star with a stellar classification of F5 V. It is about 2.5 billion years old and is spinning with a projected rotational velocity of 12 km/s. The abundance of iron is similar to that in the Sun. The star has an estimated 1.25 times the mass of the Sun and is radiating just over 7 times the Sun's luminosity from its photosphere at an effective temperature of around 6,454 K.
