= Sigma Andromedae =

Star in the constellation Andromeda

- Location of σ Andromedae (circled)

Observation data Epoch J2000.0 Equinox ICRS
- Constellation: Andromeda
- Right ascension: 00^{h} 18^{m} 19.65737^{s}
- Declination: +36° 47′ 06.8085″
- Apparent magnitude (V): +4.51

Characteristics
- Evolutionary stage: main sequence
- Spectral type: A2 V
- U−B color index: +0.07
- B−V color index: +0.05

Astrometry
Radial velocity (R_{v})	–8.0 km/s
Proper motion (μ)	RA: −65.212(153) mas/yr Dec.: −42.221(124) mas/yr
Parallax (π)	23.2542±0.1809 mas
Distance	140 ± 1 ly (43.0 ± 0.3 pc)
Absolute magnitude (M_{V})	1.33

Details
Mass	2.12±0.01 M_{☉}
Radius	2.13 R_{☉}
Luminosity	21.23 L_{☉}
Surface gravity (log g)	4.02 cgs
Temperature	8,929 K
Rotational velocity (v sin i)	123 km/s
Age	450 Myr

Other designations
- σ And, 25 Andromedae, BD+35°44, FK5 1005, HD 1404, HIP 1473, HR 68, SAO 53798, PPM 65183

Database references
SIMBAD	data

Sigma Andromedae is a single star in the northern constellation of Andromeda. Its Bayer designation is Latinized from σ Andromedae, and abbreviated Sig And or σ And, respectively. The star has an apparent visual magnitude of +4.5, which is bright enough to be seen with the naked eye from most locations. Parallax measurements made during the Gaia mission place it at a distance of about 140 light-years (43 parsecs). The magnitude of the star is diminished by 0.08 from extinction caused by intervening gas and dust. It is drifting closer to the Sun with a radial velocity of –8 km/s.

This star has a stellar classification of A2 V, which matches the spectrum of an A-type main sequence star. It is about 450 million years old and is spinning rapidly with a projected rotational velocity of 123 km/s. The star has 2.12 times the mass of the Sun and 2.13 times the Sun's girth. It is radiating 21 times the luminosity of the Sun from its photosphere at an effective temperature of 8,929 K, giving it the white-hued glow of an A-type star.

In the past, radial velocity variations have been reported, but this remains unconfirmed. The star does not show any significant photometric variations and is used as an ubvy standard star. A debris disk of warm dust around this star has been detected by Spitzer Space Telescope. A model fit to the data yields an orbital distance of 20.3 AU from the host star with a mean temperature of 132.9 K.

Sigma Andromedae is a candidate for membership in the stream of stars associated with the Ursa Major Moving Group. This is a set of stars that share a common motion through space, which suggests they originated together.

== Naming ==
In Chinese, 天廄 (Tiān Jiù), meaning Celestial Stable, refers to an asterism consisting of σ Andromedae, θ Andromedae, ρ Andromedae and seven other fainter, unidentified stars. Consequently, the Chinese name for σ Andromedae itself is 天廄三 (Tiān Jiù sān, English: the Third Star of Celestial Stable.)
