= 13 Andromedae =

Star in the constellation Andromeda

- Location of 13 Andromedae (circled)

Observation data Epoch J2000 Equinox ICRS
- Constellation: Andromeda
- Right ascension: 23^{h} 27^{m} 07.40^{s}
- Declination: +42° 54′ 43.2″
- Apparent magnitude (V): 5.75

Characteristics
- Evolutionary stage: main sequence
- Spectral type: B9 III or B9 Mn
- B−V color index: −0.007±0.004
- Variable type: α^{2} CVn

Astrometry
Radial velocity (R_{v})	−8.1±1.6 km/s
Proper motion (μ)	RA: +87.132 mas/yr Dec.: +17.127 mas/yr
Parallax (π)	10.3618±0.0465 mas
Distance	315 ± 1 ly (96.5 ± 0.4 pc)
Absolute magnitude (M_{V})	0.98

Details
Mass	2.5 M_{☉}
Radius	2.4 R_{☉}
Luminosity	48 L_{☉}
Surface gravity (log g)	4.08 cgs
Temperature	9,790 K
Rotational velocity (v sin i)	75 km/s
Age	339 Myr

Other designations
- 13 And, V388 Andromedae, BD+42°4672, HD 220885, HIP 115755, HR 8913, SAO 53039, PPM 64250

Database references
SIMBAD	data

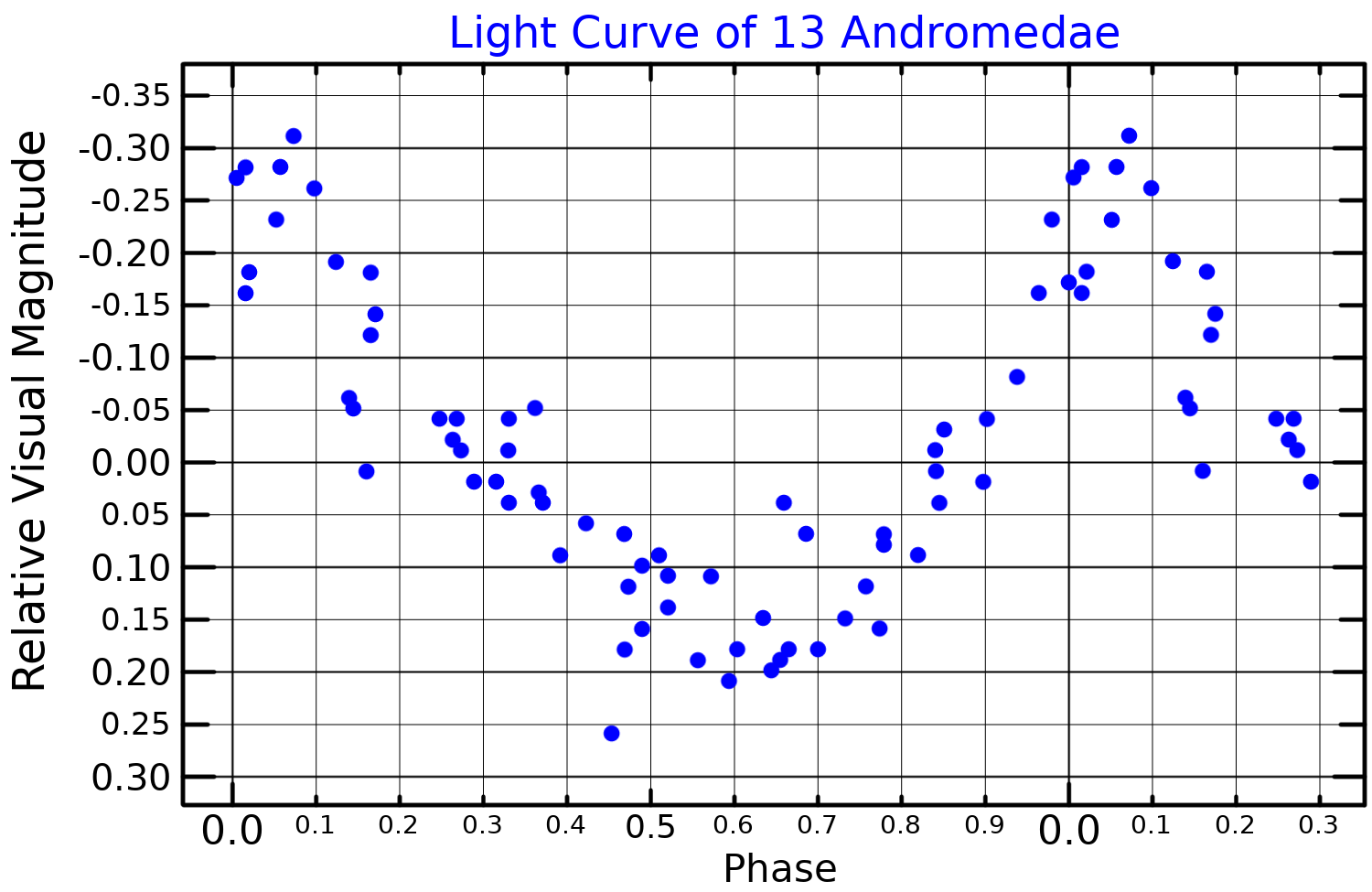
The visual band light curve of 13 Andromedae, adapted from Adelman (2005)

13 Andromedae, abbreviated 13 And, is a single, blue-white hued variable star in the northern constellation of Andromeda. 13 Andromedae is the Flamsteed designation, while it bears the variable star designation V388 Andromedae. With a typical apparent visual magnitude of around 5.75, it is dimly visible to the naked eye under good seeing conditions. The distance to this star can be directly estimated from its annual parallax shift of 10.4 mas, yielding a range of 315 light years. At that distance, its brightness is diminished by an extinction of 0.13 magnitude due to interstellar dust. The star is moving closer to the Earth with a heliocentric radial velocity of −8 km/s.

The variability of 13 Andromedae was first detected in Hipparcos satellite data, and it received its variable star designation in 1999.

This is a magnetic chemically peculiar star that has been assigned stellar classifications of B9 III or B9 Mn. It is a variable star of the Alpha^{2} Canum Venaticorum type, ranging in magnitude from 5.73 down to 5.77 with a period of 1.47946 days. The star has a high rate of spin, showing a projected rotational velocity of 75 km/s. 13 Andromedae is around 339 million years old and shines with 48 times the Sun's luminosity.
