= NGC 4638 =

Galaxy in the constellation Virgo

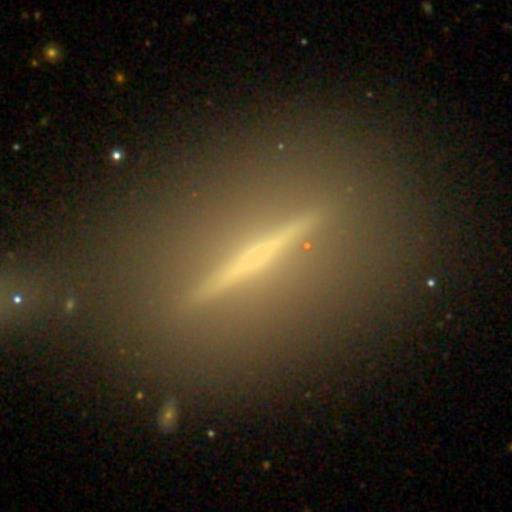
- Sloan Digital Sky Survey image of NGC 4638.

Observation data (J2000 epoch)
- Constellation: Virgo
- Right ascension: 12^{h} 42^{m} 47.4^{s}
- Declination: 11° 26′ 33″
- Redshift: 0.003843
- Heliocentric radial velocity: 1152 km/s
- Distance: 50.77 Mly (15.565 Mpc)
- Group or cluster: Virgo Cluster
- Apparent magnitude (V): 12.1

Characteristics
- Type: S0
- Size: ~42,800 ly (13.13 kpc) (estimated)
- Apparent size (V): 2.17 x 1.27

Other designations
- NGC 4667, CGCG 70-229, CGCG 71-6, MCG 2-32-187, PGC 42728, UGC 7880, VCC 1938

NGC 4638 is an edge-on lenticular galaxy located about 50 million light-years away in the constellation Virgo. NGC 4638 was discovered by astronomer William Herschel on March 15, 1784. The galaxy is a member of the Virgo Cluster.

== Structure ==
At the center of NGC 4638, there is a small bulge. There is also an edge-on disk and a diffuse, boxy halo. The shallow surface brightness gradient of the halo is characteristic of a large spheroidal galaxy. This means that NGC 4638 has properties of both S0 and Sph galaxies.

== See also ==
- List of NGC objects (4001–5000)
