= 65 Andromedae =

Star in the constellation Andromeda

- Location of 65 Andromedae (circled)

Observation data Epoch J2000 Equinox J2000
- Constellation: Andromeda
- Right ascension: 02^{h} 25^{m} 37.42298^{s}
- Declination: +50° 16′ 43.0633″
- Apparent magnitude (V): 4.734

Characteristics
- Evolutionary stage: giant
- Spectral type: K4.5 III
- B−V color index: 1.532±0.009

Astrometry
Radial velocity (R_{v})	−4.93±0.20 km/s
Proper motion (μ)	RA: +24.289 mas/yr Dec.: −14.483 mas/yr
Parallax (π)	7.6317±0.1467 mas
Distance	427 ± 8 ly (131 ± 3 pc)
Absolute magnitude (M_{V})	−1.10

Details
Mass	1.63 M_{☉}
Radius	47 R_{☉}
Luminosity	372 L_{☉}
Surface gravity (log g)	1.650 cgs
Temperature	3,927±24 K
Metallicity [Fe/H]	−0.210 dex
Age	3.01 Gyr

Other designations
- 65 And, BD+49°656, FK5 2165, HD 14872, HIP 11313, HR 699, SAO 23319, PPM 27605, WDS J02256+5017A

Database references
SIMBAD	data

65 Andromedae, abbreviated 65 And, is a single, orange-hued star in the northern constellation of Andromeda. With an apparent magnitude of 4.73, it is visible to the naked eye. The distance to 65 And can be derived from its annual parallax shift of 7.6 mas, which yields a range of around 430 light years. At that distance, its brightness is relatively lowered primarily by the inverse square law but also by an extinction of 0.16 magnitude due to interstellar dust. The star is moving closer to the Earth with a heliocentric radial velocity of −5 km/s.

This is a mildly iron-deficient giant star with a stellar classification of K4.5 III, which indicates that, at the age of three billion years, is an evolved star that has exhausted the hydrogen at its core and expanded its radius. The measured angular diameter of this star, after correction for limb darkening, is 3.28±0.06 mas. At the estimated distance of this star, this yields a physical size of about 47 times the radius of the Sun. The star has 1.6 times the mass of the Sun and is radiating 372 times the Sun's luminosity from its enlarged photosphere at an effective temperature of 3,927 K.
