= 66 Andromedae =

Binary star system in the constellation Andromeda

- Location of 66 Andromedae (circled)

Observation data Epoch J2000 Equinox ICRS
- Constellation: Andromeda
- Right ascension: 02^{h} 27^{m} 51.77808^{s}
- Declination: +50° 34′ 11.9069″
- Apparent magnitude (V): 6.16 (7.26/7.46)

Characteristics
- Spectral type: F4 V
- B−V color index: 0.435 (4.2/4.5)

Astrometry
| Radial velocity (R_{v}) | −5.3±4.3 km/s |
| Proper motion (μ) | RA: +31.719 mas/yr Dec.: −90.246 mas/yr |
| Parallax (π) | 18.4347±0.0307 mas |
| Distance | 176.9 ± 0.3 ly (54.25 ± 0.09 pc) |
| Absolute magnitude (M_{V}) | 3.1±0.1/3.4±0.1 |

Orbit
| Period (P) | 10.989861±0.000024 d |
| Semi-major axis (a) | ≥ 6.9 Gm (9.9 R_{☉}) |
| Eccentricity (e) | 0.19236±0.00057 |
| Periastron epoch (T) | 2,454,007.675±0.006 JD |
| Argument of periastron (ω) (secondary) | 250.55±0.18° |
| Semi-amplitude (K_{1}) (primary) | 46.719±0.034 km/s |
| Semi-amplitude (K_{2}) (secondary) | 48.083±0.038 km/s |

Details

66 And A
| Mass | 1.38 M_{☉} |
| Radius | 1.7±0.1 R_{☉} |
| Luminosity | 4.9±0.5 L_{☉} |
| Surface gravity (log g) | 4.21 cgs |
| Temperature | 6,627±225 K |
| Metallicity [Fe/H] | −0.14±0.08 dex |
| Rotational velocity (v sin i) | 4.2±1.0 km/s |
| Age | 1.273 Gyr |

66 And B
| Radius | 1.5±0.1 R_{☉} |
| Luminosity | 3.8±0.4 L_{☉} |
| Rotational velocity (v sin i) | 4.4±1.0 km/s |

Other designations
- 66 And, BD+49°666, HD 15138, HIP 11465, HR 709, SAO 23353, PPM 27645

Database references
| SIMBAD | data |

66 Andromedae is a binary star system in the northern constellation of Andromeda, near the northern border with Perseus. The designation is from the star catalogue of English astronomer John Flamsteed, first published in 1712. It has a combined apparent magnitude of 6.16, which is near the lower limit of stars that are visible to the naked eye under good seeing conditions. An annual parallax shift of 18.43 mas provides a distance estimate of 176.9 light years. The net radial velocity of the system is poorly constrained, but the pair appear to be moving closer to the Earth with a heliocentric radial velocity of around −5 km/s.

The variable velocity of this system was reported by Reynold K. Young from the David Dunlap Observatory in 1945. This is a double-lined spectroscopic binary system with an orbital period of 11 days and an eccentricity of 0.19. The two components are similar stars, each of 7th magnitude, with a combined stellar classification of F4 V, matching that of an F-type main sequence star. The system is around 1.3 billion years old and both stars are spinning slowly with a projected rotational velocity of around 4–5 km/s.
