= 63 Andromedae =

Star in the constellation Andromeda

- Location of 63 Andromedae (circled)

Observation data Epoch J2000 Equinox ICRS
- Constellation: Andromeda
- Right ascension: 02^{h} 20^{m} 58.202^{s}
- Declination: +50° 09′ 05.39″
- Apparent magnitude (V): 5.59

Characteristics
- Evolutionary stage: main sequence
- Spectral type: B9VpSi
- B−V color index: −0.089
- Variable type: α^{2} CVn

Astrometry
Radial velocity (R_{v})	−0.30 km/s
Proper motion (μ)	RA: 39.818 mas/yr Dec.: −31.607 mas/yr
Parallax (π)	8.5275±0.1684 mas
Distance	382 ± 8 ly (117 ± 2 pc)
Absolute magnitude (M_{V})	+0.26

Details
Mass	3.07±0.14 M_{☉}
Radius	2.4±0.3 R_{☉}
Luminosity	110 L_{☉}
Surface gravity (log g)	4.29±0.11 cgs
Temperature	11,967 K
Rotation	4.189 days

Other designations
- PZ And, BD+49 640, HD 14392, HIP 10944, HR 682, NSV 790, SAO 37960, PPM 27476

Database references
SIMBAD	data

63 Andromedae (abbreviated 63 And) is an Alpha^{2} Canum Venaticorum (α^{2} CVn) variable star in the constellation Andromeda. Its variable star designation is PZ Andromedae. With an apparent magnitude of about 5.6, it is bright enough to be seen by naked eye. Based upon an annual parallax shift of 8.53 mas, it is located 382 light years away.

The spectral type of this star is B9VpSi, indicating that it is a chemically peculiar main sequence star with abnormally strong silicon lines. Although it has a B-type spectral class, this type of star is known as an Ap star, a class of stars with very strong spectral lines of certain heavy elements and strong magnetic fields. The chemical peculiarities are caused by stratification in the atmosphere due to slow rotation.

The star has 3 times the mass of the Sun and 2.4 times the Sun's radius. It is radiating 110 times the Sun's luminosity from its photosphere at an effective temperature of 11,967 K.

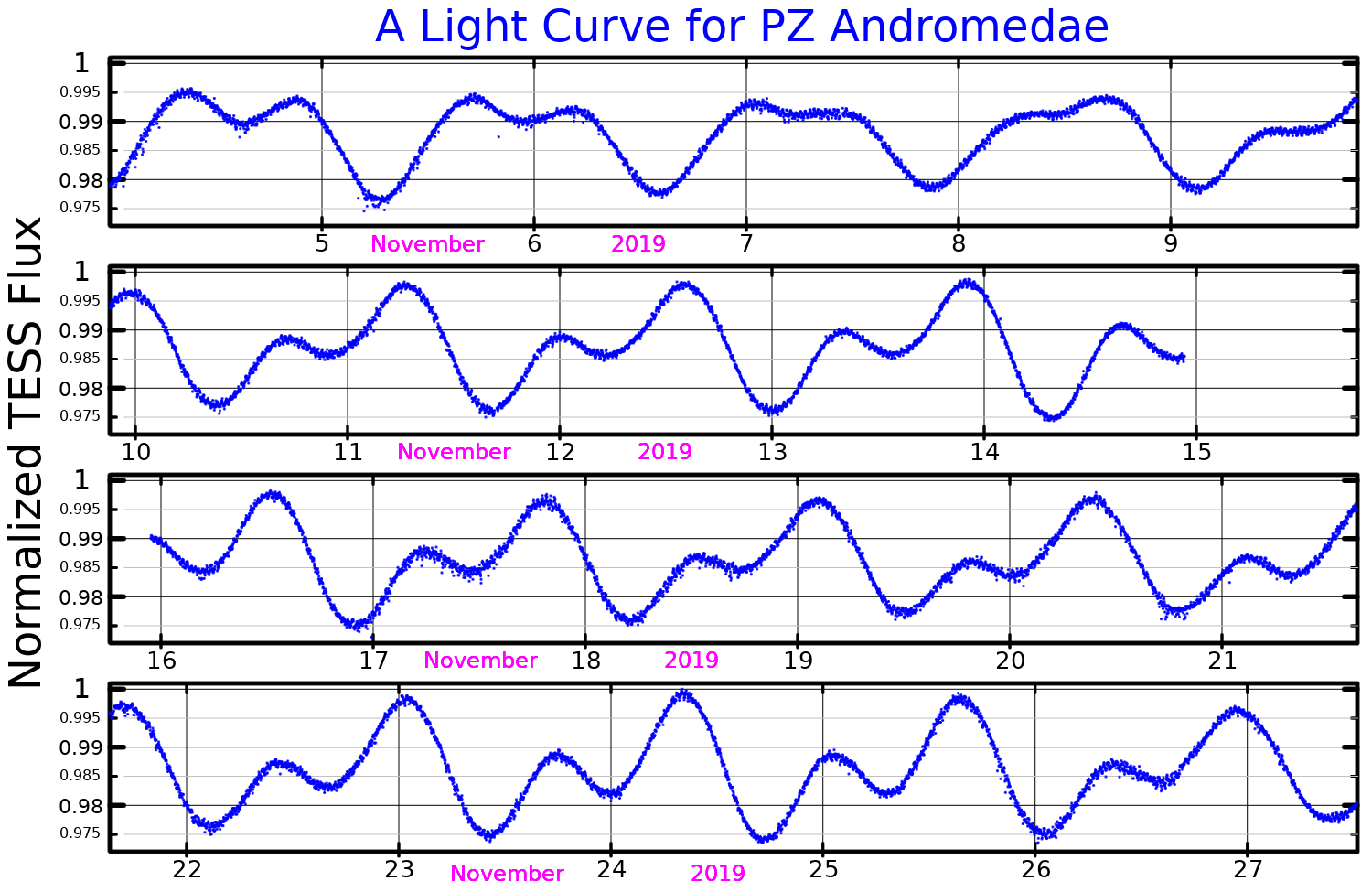
A light curve for PZ Andromedae, plotted from TESS data

63 Andromedae varies in brightness by about 0.05 magnitudes with a period of 4.189 days. This is believed to occur as it rotates. This type of variable star is known as an α^{2} Canum Venaticorum variable after the first example to be studied.
