= Tian Dajiangjun =

Chinese constellation

Tian Dajiangjun (simplified Chinese: 天大将军; traditional Chinese: 天大將軍; pinyin: Tiān Dà Jiāngjūn) is a Chinese constellation (星官) in the region of Lóu (婁宿天區). It contains 11 or 12 stars, in the Western constellations Andromeda and Triangulum. Its name is translated as "Heaven's Great General" or "Celestial Grand General". In older Western sources its name was transliterated as Teen Ta Tseang Keun or Tëen ta tsëang keun. R. H. Allen based identification of Chinese star names by the English astronomer John Williams (1797–1874) and the naturalist John Reeves. But Allen lacked last word kuen as Tien Ta Tseang and also transliterated it as Tsien Ta Tseang.

== Identification of stars ==
No.	Name	Chang	by Chang	with Yi Xiang Kao Cheng	with Temmon Keitō
1	天大將軍一	353	γ Andromedae	γ Andromedae	54 Andromedae*
2	天大將軍二	297	φ Persei	54 Andromedae*	51 Andromedae
3	天大將軍三	278	υ Persei	51 Andromedae	49 Andromedae
4	天大將軍四	258	？	49 Andromedae	ω Andromedae
5	天大將軍五	282	？	χ Andromedae	χ Andromedae
6	天大將軍六	274	υ Andromedae	υ Andromedae	50 Andromedae
7	天大將軍七	287	τ Andromedae	τ Andromedae	56 Andromedae
8	天大將軍八	328	？	56 Andromedae	58 Andromedae
9	天大將軍九	370	β Trianguli	β Trianguli	β Trianguli
10	天大將軍十	397	γ Trianguli	γ Trianguli	γ Trianguli
11	天大將軍十一	396	？	δ Trianguli	γ Andromedae
12	天大將軍増一	231	？	――	――
13	天大將軍増二	232	ξ Andromedae	――	――
14	天大將軍増三	247	ω Andromedae	――	――
15	天大將軍増四	299	？	――	――
16	天大將軍増五	351	？	――	――
17	天大將軍増六	384	？	――	――
18	天大將軍増七	394	？	――	――
19	天大將軍増八	439	？	――	――
20	天大將軍増九	368	？	――	――
21	天大將軍増十	377	？	――	――
22	天大將軍増十一	321	？	――	――
23	天大將軍増十二	387	？	――	――
24	天大將軍増十三	405	？	――	――
25	天大將軍増十四	400	？	――	――
26	天大將軍増十五	334	？	――	――
27	天大將軍増十六	317	2 Persei	――	――
28	天大將軍増十七	437	？	――	――

Notes

^{＊} 54 And is designated as φ Per in recent times.
