= Adhil =

Star disambiguation page

The name Adhil /əˈdɪl/ has been applied to a number of stars, especially the star of Xi Andromedae in the constellation of Andromeda. It is the name approved by the International Astronomical Union for Xi Andromedae.

== Origin ==
Adhil was originally applied to the description of Ptolemy's 21st and 22nd of Andromeda in his star catalogue in Latin translated version of Almagest.

There are two identifications of Ptolemy's 21st and 22nd of Andromeda:

Ptolemy	P - K	Manitius
# 21	49A And	46ξ And
# 22	52χ And	48ω And

Adhil is applied to Xi Andromedae from Manitius' identification of Ptolemy's 21st of Andromeda.

Bayer gave Adhil for 60/b And in his prominent work Uranometria in 1603, and Bode followed Bayer in his great star atlas Uranographia in 1801.

== Etymology ==
Adhil is a lingua franca term from an Arabic phrase الذيل al-dhayl [að-ðáil] meaning 'the train [of a garment]' (lit. 'the tail').

== See also ==
- Xi Andromedae (recent Adhil)
- 60 Andromedae (Bayer and Bode's Adhil)
- 49 Andromedae (one of adhil in the Almagest)
- Chi Andromedae (one of adhil in the Almagest)
- Syrma (Iota Virginis)
