= Tau Andromedae =

Star in the constellation Andromeda

τ Andromedae
- Location of τ Andromedae (circled)

Observation data Epoch J2000 Equinox ICRS
- Constellation: Andromeda
- Right ascension: 01^{h} 40^{m} 34.81619^{s}
- Declination: +40° 34′ 37.3397″
- Apparent magnitude (V): +4.94

Characteristics
- Spectral type: B5 III
- U−B color index: −0.41
- B−V color index: −0.09

Astrometry
Radial velocity (R_{v})	−13.9±2.6 km/s
Proper motion (μ)	RA: 17.889(178) mas/yr Dec.: −20.981(95) mas/yr
Parallax (π)	4.7804±0.1304 mas
Distance	680 ± 20 ly (209 ± 6 pc)
Absolute magnitude (M_{V})	−1.73

Details
Mass	4.8 M_{☉}
Radius	2.7 R_{☉}
Luminosity	851 L_{☉}
Surface gravity (log g)	3.357±0.020 cgs
Temperature	12,680±100 K
Rotational velocity (v sin i)	74±13 km/s
Age	217 Myr

Other designations
- τ And, 53 And, BD+39 378, HD 10205, HIP 7818, HR 477, SAO 37418, PPM 44297

Database references
SIMBAD	data

Tau Andromedae is a single star in the northern constellation of Andromeda. Its Bayer designation is Latinized from τ Andromedae, and abbreviated Tau And or τ And, respectively. The star has an apparent visual magnitude of +4.94, which is bright enough to be viewed from dark suburban skies. From parallax measurements made during the Gaia mission, the distance to this star can be estimated as roughly 680 light-years (210 parsecs) from Earth. The brightness of this star is diminished by 0.24 in magnitude due to extinction caused by intervening gas and dust. It is drifting closer to the Sun with a radial velocity of −14 km/s.

The spectrum of this star matches a stellar classification of B5 III, with the luminosity class of III indicating that this is a giant star. It is radiating about 851 times the luminosity of the Sun from its photosphere at an effective temperature of 12,670 K. The star is an estimated 217 million years old and is spinning with a high projected rotational velocity of ~74 km/s.

== Naming ==
In Chinese, 天大將軍 (Tiān Dà Jiāng Jūn), meaning Heaven's Great General, refers to an asterism consisting of τ Andromedae, γ Andromedae, φ Persei, 51 Andromedae, 49 Andromedae, χ Andromedae, υ Andromedae, 56 Andromedae, β Trianguli, γ Trianguli and δ Trianguli. Consequently, the Chinese name for τ Andromedae itself is 天大將軍七 (Tiān Dà Jiāng Jūn qī, English: the Seventh Star of Heaven's Great General.).
