= Phi Andromedae =

Binary star in the constellation Andromeda

- Location of φ Andromedae (upper left).

Observation data Epoch J2000 Equinox ICRS
- Constellation: Andromeda
- Right ascension: 01^{h} 09^{m} 30.12562^{s}
- Declination: +47° 14′ 30.4594″
- Apparent magnitude (V): 4.25 (4.46/6.06)

Characteristics
- Spectral type: B7 Ve + B9 V
- U−B color index: −0.34
- B−V color index: −0.07
- R−I color index: −0.05

Astrometry
Radial velocity (R_{v})	−0.1 km/s
Proper motion (μ)	RA: +4.05 mas/yr Dec.: −12.43 mas/yr
Parallax (π)	4.55±0.60 mas
Distance	approx. 720 ly (approx. 220 pc)
Absolute magnitude (M_{V})	−2.41

Orbit
Name	φ And B
Period (P)	554.3 ± 67.1y yr
Semi-major axis (a)	0.573 ± 0.051″
Eccentricity (e)	0.385 ± 0.043
Inclination (i)	142.2 ± 2.8°
Longitude of the node (Ω)	337.2 ± 3.2°
Periastron epoch (T)	17,740 ± 1,837 HMJD
Argument of periastron (ω) (secondary)	112.6 ± 9.1°

Details

φ And A
Luminosity	882 L_{☉}
Surface gravity (log g)	3.150 cgs
Temperature	13,490 K
Rotational velocity (v sin i)	75 km/s
Age	63.1 ± 13.7 Myr

Other designations
- Junnanmen, φ And, 42 And, BD+46 275, HD 6811, HIP 5434, HR 335, SAO 36972, PPM 43693, ADS 940

Database references
SIMBAD	data

Phi Andromedae, also named Junnanmen, is a binary star system near the border of the northern constellation of Andromeda. This system has a combined apparent visual magnitude of 4.25 and is visible to the naked eye. Based upon parallax measurements made during the Hipparcos mission, this star system is located at a distance of about 720 light-years (220 parsecs) from Earth.

== Nomenclature ==
Phi Andromedae (Latinized from φ Andromedae, abbreviated φ And) is the star's Bayer designation.

In Chinese astronomy, φ Andromedae forms the single-star asterism Jūnnánmén (軍南門 or 军南门, "Southern Military Gate"). R. H. Allen's Star Names refers to this asterism as Keun Nan Mun, "the Camp's South Gate", and includes χ Andromedae in it, but in Chinese sources χ Andromedae is a member of the Tian Dajiangjun (Heaven's Great General) asterism. Another identification of Jūnnánmén is α Trianguli.

The IAU Working Group on Star Names approved the name Junnanmen for Phi Andromedae A on 25 August 2025 and it is now so entered in the IAU Catalog of Star Names.

== Components ==
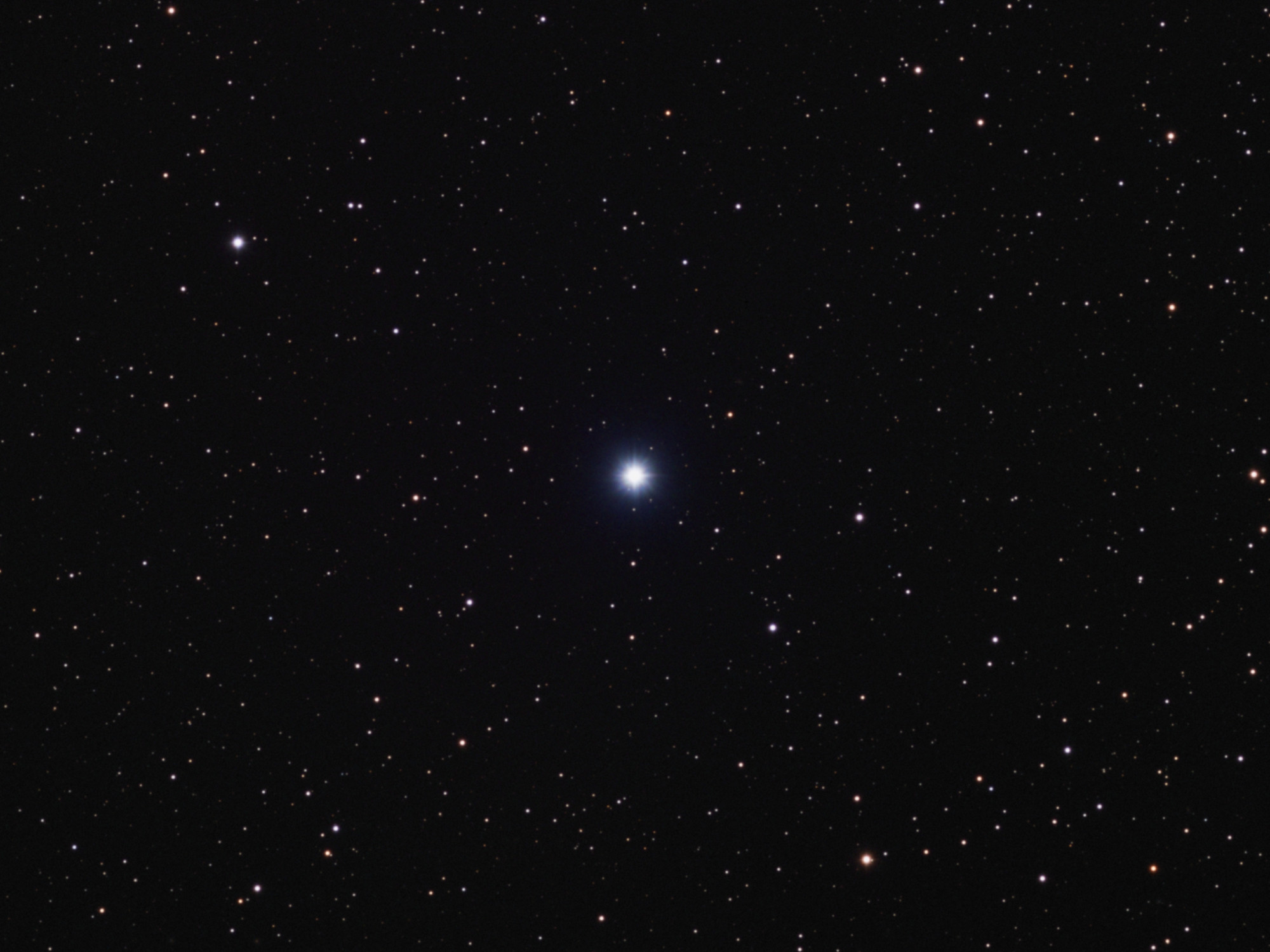
φ Andromedae in optical light

The 4.46 magnitude primary component is a Be star with a stellar classification of B7 Ve, indicating that it is a B-type main sequence star that shows prominent emission lines of hydrogen in its spectrum. These emission lines come from a flattened decretion disk of hot gas that is orbiting the host star. The star is rotating rapidly with a projected rotational velocity of 75 km/s. The pole of the star is inclined around 20° to the line of sight from the Earth.

The 6.06 magnitude companion star is a B-type main sequence star with a classification of B9 V. On average the two stars are separated by about 0.6 arcseconds and have an orbital period of roughly 554 years. Based upon their orbital elements, the system has a combined mass of around 6.5±2.8 times the mass of the Sun.
