= Beta Trianguli =

Binary star in the constellation Triangulum

β Trianguli
- Location of β Trianguli (circled)

Observation data Epoch J2000.0 Equinox ICRS
- Constellation: Triangulum
- Right ascension: 02^{h} 09^{m} 32.62712^{s}
- Declination: +34° 59′ 14.2694″
- Apparent magnitude (V): +3.00 (3.44 + 4.19)

Characteristics
- Spectral type: A8III / A3III
- U−B color index: +0.11
- B−V color index: +0.21 / 0.07

Astrometry
Radial velocity (R_{v})	+9.9 km/s
Proper motion (μ)	RA: 149.16 mas/yr Dec.: –39.10 mas/yr
Parallax (π)	23.169±0.434 mas
Distance	141 ± 3 ly (43.2 ± 0.8 pc)
Absolute magnitude (M_{V})	−0.136 (0.305 + 0.1055)

Orbit
Period (P)	31.3884 d
Semi-major axis (a)	0.330±0.005 AU
Eccentricity (e)	0.53
Periastron epoch (T)	2432004.255 JD
Argument of periastron (ω) (secondary)	318.4°
Semi-amplitude (K_{1}) (primary)	33.3 km/s
Semi-amplitude (K_{2}) (secondary)	69.2 km/s

Details

A
Mass	3.52±0.27 M_{☉}
Radius	4.38 (Note: Calculated, using the Stefan-Boltzmann law and the star's effective temperature and luminosity, with respect to the solar nominal effective temperature of 5,772 K: $$\sqrt{\biggl(\frac{5,772}{7,683}\biggr)^4 \cdot 10^{1.78}} = 4.38\ R_\odot.$$) R_{☉}
Luminosity	60.3+15.6 −12.4 L_{☉}
Surface gravity (log g)	3.70 cgs
Temperature	7,683 K
Rotational velocity (v sin i)	70 km/s
Age	0.40+0.23 −0.15 Gyr

B
Mass	1.37±0.09 M_{☉}
Radius	2.44 (Note: Calculated, using the Stefan-Boltzmann law and the star's effective temperature and luminosity, with respect to the solar nominal effective temperature of 5,772 K: $$\sqrt{\biggl(\frac{5,772}{8,759}\biggr)^4 \cdot 10^{1.50}} = 2.44\ R_\odot.$$) R_{☉}
Luminosity	31.6+3.9 −3.4 L_{☉}
Temperature	8,759 K
Age	0.45+0.12 −0.09 Gyr

Other designations
- Alaybasan, β Tri, 4 Tri, BD+34°381, FK5 75, HD 13161, HIP 10064, HR 622, SAO 55306

Database references
SIMBAD	data

Beta Trianguli, formally named Alaybasan (for component A), is a binary star system in the constellation Triangulum, located about 127 light years from Earth. Although it is only a third-magnitude star, it is the brightest star in the constellation Triangulum.

== Naming ==
Beta Trianguli (Latinized from β Trianguli, abbreviated Beta Tri, β Tri) is the star's Bayer designation.

This star together with α Trianguli were called by the Arabic names Al Mīzān, "the Scale Beam", and Al-Aybasān, "the Two Joints [of Aries]"; the latter also written as Al-Anīsān, meaning "the Two Friends". Mizan has been used as a name for β Trianguli. The name Alaybasan was approved for Beta Trianguli A by the IAU Working Group on Star Names on 7 November 2025 and it is now so entered in the IAU Catalog of Star Names.

In Chinese, 天大將軍 (Tiān Dà Jiāng Jūn), meaning Heaven's Great General, refers to an asterism consisting of β Trianguli, γ Andromedae, φ Persei, 51 Andromedae, 49 Andromedae, χ Andromedae, υ Andromedae, τ Andromedae, 56 Andromedae, γ Trianguli and δ Trianguli. Consequently, the Chinese name for β Trianguli itself is 天大將軍九 (Tiān Dà Jiāng Jūn jiǔ, English: the Ninth Star of Heaven's Great General).

== Star system ==
This is a double-lined spectroscopic binary star system with an orbital period of 31.39 days and an eccentricity of 0.53. The members are separated by a distance of 0.33 AU. The primary and secondary components have stellar classifications of A8III and A3III respectively, indicating that they evolved away from the main sequence and are now giant stars. Component A is 2.6 times more massive than the Sun, but expanded to 4.4 the Sun's radius and irradiates 60 times more than the Sun. Component B is somewhat smaller and less luminous, being 2.25 times more massive, 2.44 times larger and 30 times brighter than the Sun. The system has an age around 400 million years, less than 10% that of the Solar System. Beta Trianguli is among the least variable of the stars that were observed by the Hipparcos spacecraft, with a magnitude varying by only 0.0005.

Based on observations using the Spitzer Space Telescope, as reported in 2005, this system is emitting an excess of infrared radiation. This emission can be explained by a circumbinary ring of dust. The dust is emitting infrared radiation at a blackbody temperature of 100 K. It is thought to extend from 50 to 400 AU away from the stars.

== See also ==
- Beta Trianguli Australis
- Alpheratz
- Sheratan
- Menkalinan
