= Delta Trianguli =

Binary star in the constellation Triangulum

- Location of δ Trianguli (circled)

Observation data Epoch J2000.0 Equinox ICRS
- Constellation: Triangulum
- Right ascension: 02^{h} 17^{m} 03.23016^{s}
- Declination: +34° 13′ 27.2260″
- Apparent magnitude (V): +4.865

Characteristics
- Spectral type: G0V + G9V to K4V
- U−B color index: +0.02
- B−V color index: +0.61

Astrometry
Radial velocity (R_{v})	−5.70 km/s
Proper motion (μ)	RA: 1151.83 mas/yr Dec.: −246.89 mas/yr
Parallax (π)	92.73±0.39 mas
Distance	35.2 ± 0.1 ly (10.78 ± 0.05 pc)
Absolute magnitude (M_{V})	4.69

Orbit
Name	Delta Trianguli B
Period (P)	10.02 days
Semi-major axis (a)	9.80±0.06 mas
Eccentricity (e)	0.020±0.005
Inclination (i)	167±3°
Longitude of the node (Ω)	15±9°

Details

A
Mass	0.884±0.059 M_{☉}
Radius	0.98 R_{☉}
Surface gravity (log g)	4.5 cgs
Temperature	6,215 K
Metallicity [Fe/H]	−0.39 to −0.30 dex
Rotational velocity (v sin i)	10.00 km/s
Age	8.5 to 9.0 Gyr

B
Mass	0.785±0.044 M_{☉}
Temperature	4,493 K

Other designations
- Deltoton, δ Tri, Delta Tri, 8 Trianguli, BD+33°395, GJ 92, HD 13974, HIP 10644, HR 660, SAO 55420, LHS 154, LTT 10770

Database references
SIMBAD	data

Delta Trianguli, also named Deltoton for component A, is a spectroscopic binary star system approximately 35 light-years (11 pc) away in the constellation of Triangulum. The primary star is a yellow dwarf, while the secondary star is thought to be an orange dwarf. It has an apparent magnitude of +4.87 and forms an optical (line-of-sight) triple with Gamma Trianguli and 7 Trianguli.

== Naming ==
Delta Trianguli, Latinized from δ Trianguli and abbreviated Delta Tri, is the star's Bayer designation.

Deltoton was an ancient Greek name of the constellation Triangulum, so named because the capital Greek letter delta is shaped like a triangle. The IAU Working Group on Star Names approved the name Deltoton for this star on 17 June 2025 and it is now so entered in the IAU Catalog of Star Names. The name was chosen for Delta Trianguli A, because of the "obvious pun" in that its Bayer designation is Delta.

In Chinese, 天大將軍 (Tiān Dà Jiāng Jūn), meaning Heaven's Great General, refers to an asterism consisting of δ Trianguli, γ Andromedae, φ Persei, 51 Andromedae, 49 Andromedae, χ Andromedae, υ Andromedae, τ Andromedae, 56 Andromedae, β Trianguli and γ Trianguli. Consequently, the Chinese name for δ Trianguli itself is 天大將軍十一 (Tiān Dà Jiāng Jūn shíyī, English: the Eleventh Star of Heaven's Great General).

== Stellar components ==
Delta Trianguli A is a main sequence star with a stellar classification of G0V and a mass similar to the Sun. The spectral characteristics of the smaller companion Delta Trianguli B are not well determined since the close orbit makes observations difficult, with estimates of the spectral class ranging from G9V to K4V. The Delta Trianguli stars orbit their center of mass with an estimated separation of 0.106 AU; it is certainly less than one AU. The orbital period is 10.02 days and the eccentricity of the orbit is only 0.020. The orbit is inclined about 167° to the line of sight from Earth.

A 2008 search for a tertiary companion to this system using an adaptive optics system on the VLT proved unsuccessful. Examination of the system in infrared light at 70 μm shows no excess emission that would otherwise indicate the presence of a disk of orbiting dust.

== See also ==
- V4046 Sagittarii
