= Gamma Trianguli =

Star in the constellation Triangulum

γ Trianguli
- Location of γ Trianguli (circled)

Observation data Epoch J2000 Equinox ICRS
- Constellation: Triangulum
- Right ascension: 02^{h} 17^{m} 18.86703^{s}
- Declination: +33° 50′ 49.8950″
- Apparent magnitude (V): +4.01

Characteristics
- Evolutionary stage: main sequence
- Spectral type: A1Vnn
- U−B color index: +0.02
- B−V color index: +0.02

Astrometry
Radial velocity (R_{v})	+9.9 km/s
Proper motion (μ)	RA: 44.64 mas/yr Dec.: –52.57 mas/yr
Parallax (π)	29.04±0.25 mas
Distance	112.3 ± 1.0 ly (34.4 ± 0.3 pc)
Absolute magnitude (M_{V})	+1.35

Details
Mass	2.7 M_{☉}
Radius	2.09±0.04 R_{☉}
Luminosity	28±1 L_{☉}
Temperature	9,210±100 K
Rotational velocity (v sin i)	254 km/s
Age	300 Myr

Other designations
- Apdu, γ Tri, 9 Tri, BD+33 397, FK5 79, HD 14055, HIP 10670, HR 664, SAO 55427

Database references
SIMBAD	data

Gamma Trianguli, also named Apdu, is a star in the constellation Triangulum located approximately 112 light years from Earth. It has an apparent magnitude of +4.01 and forms an optical (line-of-sight) triple with Delta Trianguli and 7 Trianguli.

== Naming ==
Gamma Trianguli (Latinized from Gamma Tri, abbreviated γ Trianguli, γ Tri) is the star's Bayer designation.

This star was part of the ancient Egyptian constellation Apdu, the Bird, which is identified with the area between Algol and Triangulum. The IAU Working Group on Star Names approved the name Apdu for this star on 13 November 2025 and it is now so entered in the IAU Catalog of Star Names.

In Chinese, 天大將軍 (Tiān Dà Jiāng Jūn), meaning Heaven's Great General, refers to an asterism consisting of γ Trianguli, γ Andromedae, φ Persei, 51 Andromedae, 49 Andromedae, χ Andromedae, υ Andromedae, τ Andromedae, 56 Andromedae, β Trianguli, and δ Trianguli. Consequently, the Chinese name for γ Trianguli itself is 天大將軍十 (Tiān Dà Jiāng Jūn shí, English: the Tenth Star of Heaven's Great General).

== Properties ==
This star has a stellar classification of A1Vnn, which indicates it is an A-type main sequence star. It has 2.7 times the mass of the Sun and 2.09 times Sun's radius. Gamma Trianguli is radiating about 33 times the luminosity of the Sun from its outer envelope at an effective temperature of 9,210 K, giving the star a white hue. The star is roughly 300 million years old.

It is rotating rapidly, with a projected rotational velocity of 254 km/s along the equator, which causes the star to take the pronounced shape of an oblate spheroid like Altair. Because the inclination of the star's axial tilt is unknown, this means that the azimuthal equatorial velocity is at least this amount and possibly higher. By comparison, the Sun is a slow rotator with an equatorial azimuthal velocity of 2 km/s. The doppler shift from the rapid rotation results in very diffuse absorption lines in the star's spectrum, as indicated by the 'nn' in the classification.

== Debris disk ==
Image of the debris disk with the REASONS survey

Orbiting the star is a dusty debris disk with a combined mass of about 2.9 × 10^{−2} times the mass of the Earth. This disk can be detected because it is being heated to a temperature of about 75 K by Gamma Trianguli and is radiating this as infrared energy. The disk is separated from the host star by an angle of 2.24 arcseconds, corresponding to a physical radius of 80 AU, or 80 times the separation of the Earth from the Sun.

Gamma Trianguli's circumstellar disk
Disks (in order from star)	Radius (AU)	Inclination
circumstellar disc	180±10	81.1+0.8 −0.9°
