= 51 Andromedae =

Red giant star in the constellation Andromeda

- Location of 51 Andromedae (circled)

Observation data Epoch J2000 Equinox ICRS
- Constellation: Andromeda
- Right ascension: 01^{h} 37^{m} 59.56074^{s}
- Declination: +48° 37′ 41.5798″
- Apparent magnitude (V): 3.57

Characteristics
- Spectral type: K3- III CN0.5
- U−B color index: +1.44
- B−V color index: +1.28

Astrometry
Radial velocity (R_{v})	18.41 km/s
Proper motion (μ)	RA: +61.334 mas/yr Dec.: -113.100 mas/yr
Parallax (π)	19.2489±0.4077 mas
Distance	169 ± 4 ly (52 ± 1 pc)
Absolute magnitude (M_{V})	−0.04

Details
Mass	1.75±0.15 M_{☉}
Radius	20.91±0.20 R_{☉}
Luminosity	142.1±7.6 L_{☉}
Surface gravity (log g)	2.01 cgs
Temperature	4,316±54 K
Metallicity [Fe/H]	0.07 dex
Age	1.70±0.40 Gyr

Other designations
- υ Per, 51 And, BD+47°467, HD 9927, HIP 7607, HR 464, SAO 37375, PPM 44238

Database references
SIMBAD	data

51 Andromedae, abbreviated 51 And and formally named Nembus /ˈnɛmbəs/, is the 5th brightest star in the northern constellation of Andromeda, very slightly dimmer than the Andromeda Galaxy also being of 4th magnitude. It is an orange K-type giant star with an apparent magnitude of +3.57 and is about 169 light-years from the Earth/solar system. It is traditionally depicted as one of the two northern, far upper ends of the mythological, chained-to-the-rocks princess, the other being binary star system Gamma Andromedae.

At an estimated age of 1.7 billion years, this is an evolved red giant star with a stellar classification of K3- III CN0.5. The suffix notation indicates a mild enhancement of cyanogen absorption lines in its spectrum. This star has 1.8 times the mass of the Sun and it has expanded to 20.9 times the Sun's radius. It is radiating 142 times the Sun's luminosity from its enlarged photosphere at an effective temperature of 4,316 K.

== Nomenclature ==
51 Andromedae is the star's Flamsteed designation. Ptolemy included this star in Andromeda in the Almagest. It was for a time moved into the greater form of Perseus envisioned by Johann Bayer as Upsilon Persei. Flamsteed oversaw its constellation reverting and the International Astronomical Union (IAU) made his 51 Andromedae its official designation in 1930.

The star bore the name Nembus, of undetermined origin and meaning, in Bayer's Uranometria (1603) and Bode's star atlas Uranographia (1801). In 2016, the IAU organized a Working Group on Star Names (WGSN) to catalog and standardize proper names for stars. The WGSN approved the name Nembus for this star on 5 September 2017 and it is now so included in the List of IAU-approved Star Names.

In Chinese, 天大將軍 (Tiān Dà Jiāng Jūn), meaning Heaven's Great General, refers to an asterism consisting of 51 Andromedae, Gamma Andromedae, Phi Persei, 49 Andromedae, Chi Andromedae, Upsilon Andromedae, Tau Andromedae, 56 Andromedae, Beta Trianguli, Gamma Trianguli and Delta Trianguli. Consequently, the Chinese name for 51 Andromedae itself is 天大將軍三 (Tiān Dà Jiāng Jūn sān, English: the Third Star of Heaven's Great General.)
