= Phi Persei =

Star in the constellation Perseus

φ Persei
- Location of φ Persei (circled)

Observation data Epoch J2000 Equinox ICRS
- Constellation: Perseus
- Right ascension: 01^{h} 43^{m} 39.63792^{s}
- Declination: +50° 41′ 19.4328″
- Apparent magnitude (V): 4.06 (3.96 - 4.11)

Characteristics
- Spectral type: B2Vep + sdO
- U−B color index: −0.92
- B−V color index: −0.04
- Variable type: γ Cas

Astrometry
Radial velocity (R_{v})	+0.80 km/s
Proper motion (μ)	RA: +24.59 mas/yr Dec.: −14.01 mas/yr
Parallax (π)	4.54±0.20 mas
Distance	720 ± 30 ly (220 ± 10 pc)
Absolute magnitude (M_{V})	−3.11

Orbit
Period (P)	126.6731 days
Semi-major axis (a)	5.89 mas
Inclination (i)	77.6°
Longitude of the node (Ω)	295.7°
Periastron epoch (T)	2456110.03
Semi-amplitude (K_{1}) (primary)	9.97 km/s
Semi-amplitude (K_{2}) (secondary)	81.3 km/s

Details

A
Mass	9.6 M_{☉}
Radius	5.5 - 8.0 R_{☉}
Luminosity	14,454 L_{☉}
Surface gravity (log g)	4.46 cgs
Temperature	29,300 K
Rotational velocity (v sin i)	440 km/s

B
Mass	1.14 M_{☉}
Radius	1.3 R_{☉}
Luminosity	6,310 L_{☉}
Surface gravity (log g)	4.2 cgs
Temperature	53,000 K
Age	57±9 Myr

Other designations
- Dajiangjunbei, φ Per, 54 And, BD+49°444, FK5 57, GC 2102, HD 10516, HIP 8068, HR 496, SAO 22554, PPM 26670

Database references
SIMBAD	data

Phi Persei, Latinized from (Phi Per, φ Persei, φ Per) formally named Dajiangjunbei, is a class B2Vep fourth-magnitude star in the constellation Perseus, located about 720 light-years from Earth.

== Nomenclature ==
Phi Persei (Phi Per, φ Persei, φ Per) is the star's Bayer designation. Flamsteed followed Ptolemy in treating φ Persei as being in Andromeda and gave it the designation 54 Andromedae. It is isolated from the main stars of Perseus, but lies within its formal borders.

In Chinese, 天大將軍 (Tiān Dà Jiāng Jūn), meaning Heaven's Great General, refers to an asterism consisting of φ Persei, γ Andromedae, 51 Andromedae, 49 Andromedae, χ Andromedae, υ Andromedae, τ Andromedae, 56 Andromedae, β Trianguli, γ Trianguli and δ Trianguli. Consequently, the Chinese name for φ Persei itself is 天大將軍二 (Tiān Dà Jiāng Jūn èr, English: the Second Star of Heaven's Great General.).

The IAU Working Group on Star Names approved the name Dajiangjunbei for Phi Persei A on 25 August 2025 and it is now so entered in the IAU Catalog of Star Names. This means the northern star of Dajiangjun, since the determinative star was already named (Almach).

== System ==
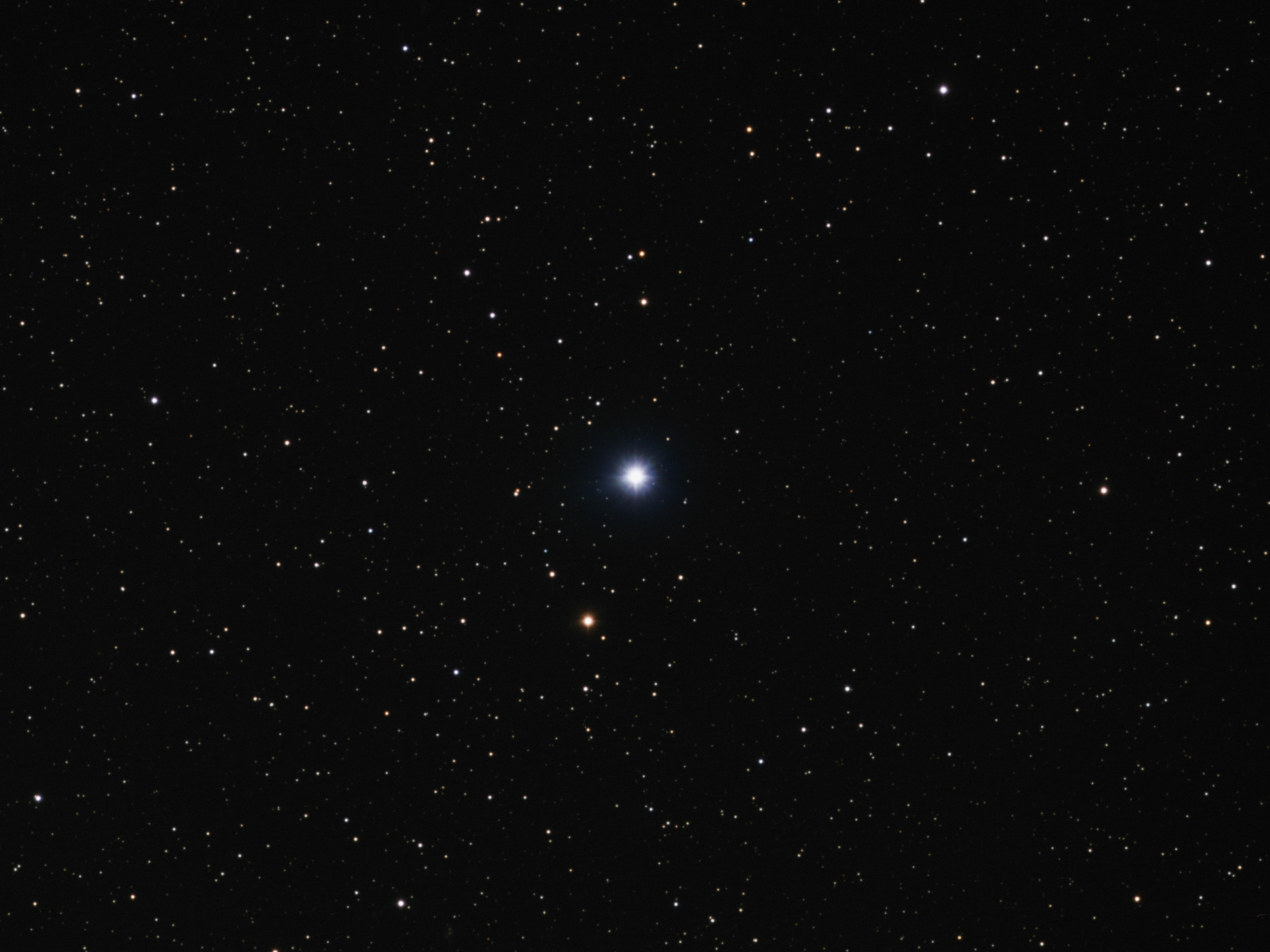
φ Persei in optical light

Phi Persei is spectroscopic binary consisting of a blue main sequence primary of class B2 and a hot subdwarf secondary. The two stars have an orbit of 217 days and are separated by about 200 R_{☉}. Phi Persei is a runaway star and extrapolating its space velocity backwards by the modelled age of the system (57 million years) places it within the Alpha Persei Cluster.

The primary star rotates rapidly with a projected equatorial velocity of 440 km/s. Due to its rapid rotation, the primary star has a polar radius about 5.5 R_{☉} and an equatorial radius of about 8.0 R_{☉}. With an effective temperature of nearly 30,000 K, it has a bolometric luminosity nearly 15,000 times higher than the Sun. The rapidly-spinning star is surrounded by a circumstellar disk. The binary orbit, the spin of the primary star, and the disk are all seen nearly edge-on. There are no eclipses, but models of the system show that the disk significantly obscures the primary star. The primary formed as a 3.8 M_{☉} star and has accreted material from its companion.

The secondary star is also a class O subdwarf, hotter than the primary but smaller and less massive. It is proposed that it is the core of a 7 M_{☉} star, with the outer layers stripped as it expanded away from the main sequence. Its luminosity is higher than expected for a normal 1.2 M_{☉} helium star, which suggests it may have evolved to helium shell burning. Although the subdwarf has a bolometric luminosity about half that of the primary, it emits most of its radiation as ultraviolet, being only about 3% as bright as the primary at visible wavelengths.

== Variability ==
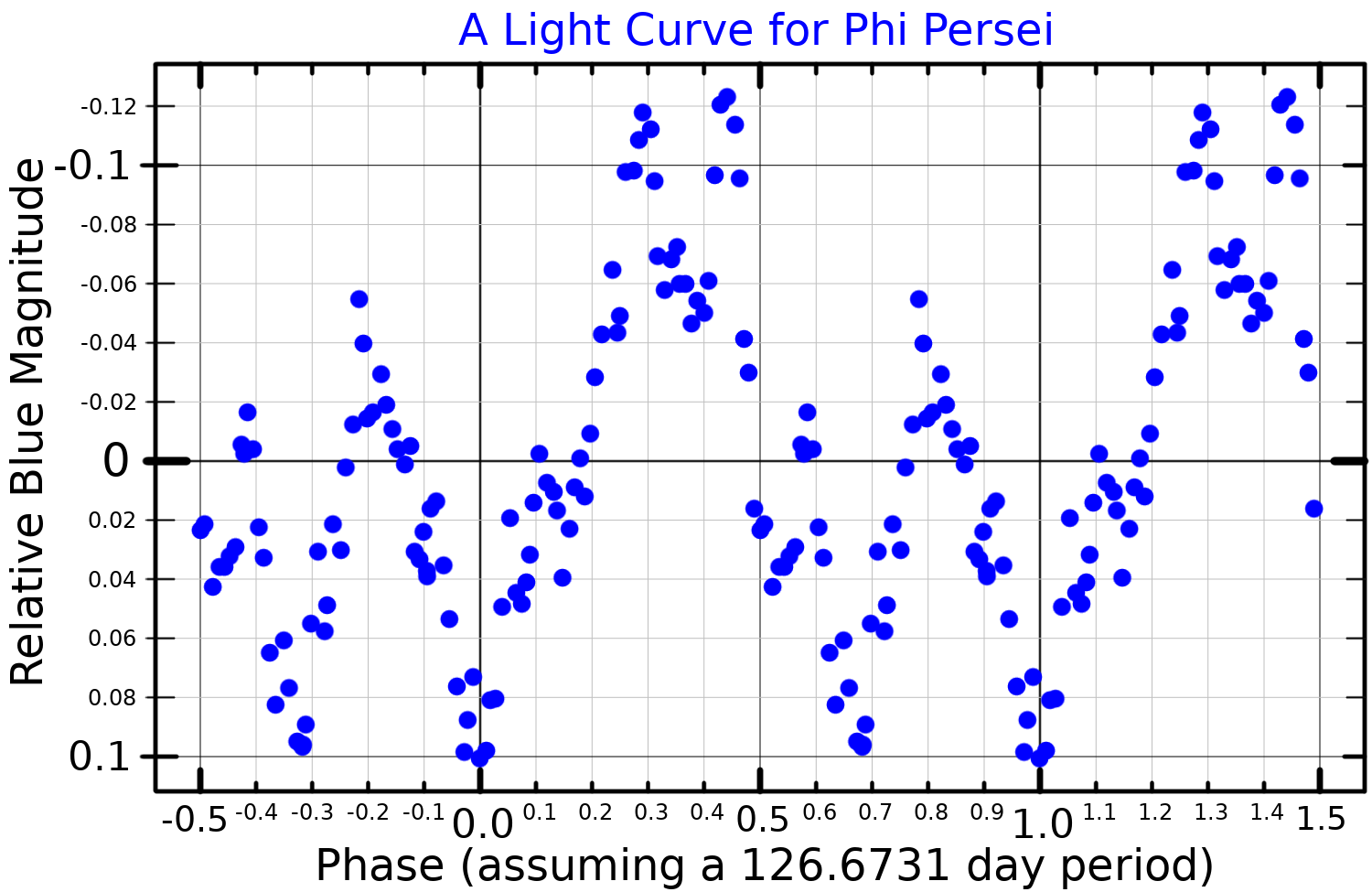
A blue-light light curve for Phi Persei, adapted from Božić et al. (1995)

Phi Persei is a variable star with both rapid and longterm variations in its brightness and spectrum. Variations occur on a daily timescale which may be related to the rotation of the primary star. Any variations originating with the secondary are difficult to detect due to its comparative faintness. Slower variations, including deep fades, are also seen. Some of the variations may correspond to the orbital period, possibly eclipses of gas streams or hot spots, but the occasional deep fades do not match any particular orbital phase. The variations are classified as γ Cassiopeiae-type, shell stars with eruptions and irregular fading.
