= Upsilon Andromedae =

Star in the constellation Andromeda

υ Andromedae / Titawin
- Location of υ Andromedae (circled)

Observation data Epoch J2000.0 Equinox ICRS
- Constellation: Andromeda
- υ And A
- Right ascension: 01^{h} 36^{m} 47.84154^{s}
- Declination: +41° 24′ 19.6514″
- Apparent magnitude (V): 4.10
- υ And D (Note: The M4.5 red dwarf has the formal designation υ And D, lettered in order of discovery, in the multiple star catalogues, but is referred to as υ And B in its discovery paper.)
- Right ascension: 01^{h} 36^{m} 50.40476^{s}
- Declination: +41° 23′ 32.1228″

Characteristics
- Spectral type: F9V + M4.5V
- Apparent magnitude (B): 4.63
- U−B color index: 0.06
- B−V color index: 0.54
- V−R color index: 0.30
- R−I color index: 0.30

Astrometry

υ And A
Radial velocity (R_{v})	−28.59±0.08 km/s
Proper motion (μ)	RA: −171.892 mas/yr Dec.: −381.815 mas/yr
Parallax (π)	74.1940±0.2083 mas
Distance	44.0 ± 0.1 ly (13.48 ± 0.04 pc)
Absolute magnitude (M_{V})	3.44±0.02

υ And D
Proper motion (μ)	RA: −172.437 mas/yr Dec.: −383.824 mas/yr
Parallax (π)	74.1815±0.0356 mas
Distance	43.97 ± 0.02 ly (13.480 ± 0.006 pc)

Details

υ And A
Mass	1.23+0.03 −0.09 M_{☉}
Radius	1.57±0.03 R_{☉}
Luminosity	3.1±0.1 L_{☉}
Habitable zone inner limit	1.43±0.05 AU
Habitable zone outer limit	2.84±0.08 AU
Surface gravity (log g)	4.0±0.1 cgs
Temperature	6,614±77 K
Metallicity [Fe/H]	0.08 dex
Rotation	7.3±0.04 d
Rotational velocity (v sin i)	9.5±0.8 km/s
Age	4.02+1.91 −0.82 Gyr

υ And D
Mass	0.190±0.006 M_{☉}
Radius	0.222±0.007 R_{☉}
Luminosity	0.00391±0.00011 L_{☉}
Temperature	3,188±106 K

Other designations
- Titawin, 50 Andromedae, BD+40 332, CCDM 01367+4125, FK5 1045, GC 1948, GCTP 331.00, Gl 61, HD 9826, HIP 7513, HR 458, LTT 10561, SAO 37362, PPM 44216, WDS 01368+4124A, 2MASS J01364784+4124200, Gaia DR2 348020448377061376

Database references
SIMBAD	data
- υ And D
Exoplanet Archive	data
ARICNS	data

Upsilon Andromedae (υ Andromedae, abbreviated Upsilon And, υ And) is a binary star located 44 light-years from Earth in the constellation of Andromeda. The system consists of an F-type main-sequence star (designated υ Andromedae A, officially named Titawin in the Amazigh language /tɪtəˈwiːn/) and a smaller red dwarf.

As of 2015, three extrasolar planets (designated Upsilon Andromedae b, c, d; named Saffar, Samh and Majriti, respectively) are believed to orbit υ Andromedae A. All three are likely to be jovian planets that are comparable in size to Jupiter. This was both the first multiple-planet system to be discovered around a main-sequence star, and the first multiple-planet system known in a multiple-star system.

== Nomenclature ==
υ Andromedae (Latinised to Upsilon Andromedae) is the system's Bayer designation. Under the rules for naming objects in binary star systems, the two components are designated A and B. Under the same rules, the first planet discovered orbiting υ Andromedae A should be designated υ Andromedae Ab. Though this more formal form is occasionally used to avoid confusion with a secondary star υ Andromedae B, it is more commonly referred to as υ Andromedae b. The other planets discovered were designated υ Andromedae c, d, and e, in order of their discovery.

In July 2014 the International Astronomical Union (IAU) launched NameExoWorlds, a process for giving proper names to certain exoplanets and their host stars. The process involved public nomination and voting for the new names. In December 2015, the IAU announced the winning names were Titawin for υ Andromedae A and Saffar, Samh and Majriti for three of its planets (b, c and d, respectively).

The winning names were those submitted by the Vega Astronomy Club of Morocco. The star is named after the Berber name Tiṭṭawin, ⵜⵉⵟⵟⴰⵡⵉⵏ, of Morocco's Tétouan city and Tunisia's Tataouine city, both cities' old town quarters are considered UNESCO World Heritage Sites. The planets honour the 10th- and 11th-century astronomers Ibn al-Saffar, Ibn al-Samh and Maslama al-Majriti of Muslim Spain.

In 2016, the IAU organized a Working Group on Star Names (WGSN) to catalog and standardize proper names for stars. In its first bulletin of July 2016, the WGSN explicitly recognized the names of exoplanets and their host stars approved by the Executive Committee Working Group Public Naming of Planets and Planetary Satellites, including the names of stars adopted during the 2015 NameExoWorlds campaign. This star is now so entered in the IAU Catalog of Star Names.

In Chinese, 天大將軍 (Tiān Dà Jiāng Jūn), meaning Heaven's Great General, refers to an asterism consisting of Upsilon Andromedae, Gamma Andromedae, Phi Persei, 51 Andromedae, 49 Andromedae, Chi Andromedae, Tau Andromedae, 56 Andromedae, Beta Trianguli, Gamma Trianguli and Delta Trianguli. Consequently, the Chinese name for Upsilon Andromedae itself is 天大將軍六 (Tiān Dà Jiāng Jūn liù, English: the Sixth Star of Heaven's Great General).

== Stellar system ==
Upsilon Andromedae is located fairly close to the Solar System: the parallax of Upsilon Andromedae A was measured by the Gaia astrometry satellite as 74.19 milliarcseconds, corresponding to a distance of 13.49 parsecs (44 light-years). Upsilon Andromedae A has an apparent magnitude of +4.09, making it visible to the naked eye even under moderately light-polluted skies, about 10 degrees east of the Andromeda Galaxy.

The Catalog of Components of Double and Multiple Stars and Washington Double Star Catalog (WDS) both list two companion stars: magnitude 12.6 UCAC3 263-13722 110" away, listed as component B; and magnitude 10.3 F2 star TYC 2822-2067-1 280" away, listed as component C.

A fainter and closer star, discovered in 2002, is confusingly referred to in the discovery paper as υ Andromedae B even though that designation is also used for a different companion. This 13th-magnitude red dwarf is 55" from υ Andromedae A and is believed to be the only one of the companions physically associated, at the same distance and a projected separation of 750 AU. It has been added to the WDS as component D.

=== Upsilon Andromedae A ===
Upsilon Andromedae A is a yellow-white dwarf of spectral type F9V, similar to the Sun, but younger, more massive, and more luminous. It is around four billion years old and has a similar proportion of iron relative to hydrogen to the Sun. At around 1.3 solar masses, it will have a shorter lifetime than the Sun. The amount of ultraviolet radiation received by any planets in the star's habitable zone would be similar to the ultraviolet flux the Earth receives from the Sun.

The X-ray emission of Upsilon Andromedae A is low for a star of its spectral class. This means that the star may be moving, or move soon, out of the main sequence and expand its radius to become a red giant star. This is consistent with the upper limits on the age of this star. The absolute magnitude for this star is about 0.6 magnitudes brighter that if it were still on the main sequence.

Upsilon Andromedae A was ranked 21st in the list of top 100 target stars for NASA's cancelled Terrestrial Planet Finder mission.

The star rotates at an inclination of 58+9
−7 degrees relative to Earth.

=== Upsilon Andromedae B ===
The red dwarf companion has a spectral type M4.5V and is located at a projected separation of 750 AU from the primary star. The true separation between the two stars is unknown because the displacement along the line of sight between Earth and the Upsilon Andromedae stars is unknown, so this value is a minimum separation. Based upon its motion through space, this is a common proper motion companion to the primary. It was discovered in 2002 in data collected as part of the 2MASS. The star is less massive and far less luminous than the Sun, and its age seems to be consistent with that of the system.

== Planetary system ==
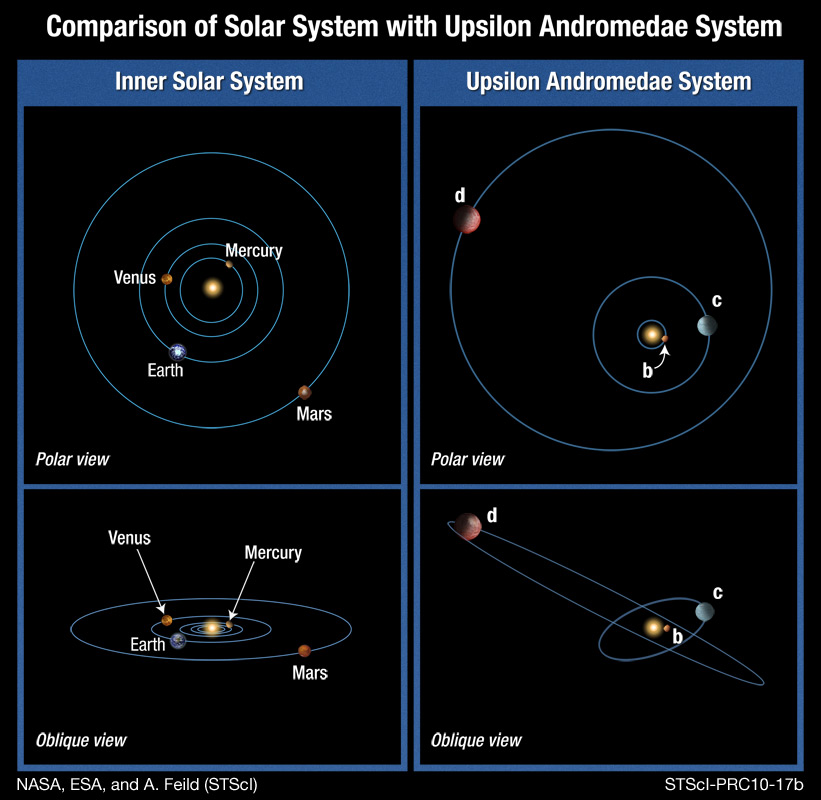

The Upsilon Andromedae A planetary system
Companion (in order from star)	Mass	Semimajor axis (AU)	Orbital period (days)	Eccentricity	Inclination (°)	Radius
b (Saffar)	2.81 M_{J}	0.0594±0.0003	4.62±0.23	0.022±0.007	14.27	1.8 R_{J}
c (Samh)	13.98+2.3 −5.3 M_{J}	0.829±0.043	241.26±0.64	0.260±0.079	7.9 ± 1	—
d (Majriti)	10.25+0.7 −3.3 M_{J}	2.530±0.014	1,276.46±0.57	0.299±0.072	23.8 ± 1	—

The innermost planet of the Upsilon Andromedae system was discovered in 1996 and announced in January 1997, together with the planet of Tau Boötis and the innermost planet of 55 Cancri. The discovery was made by Geoffrey Marcy and R. Paul Butler, both astronomers at San Francisco State University. The planet, designated Upsilon Andromedae b, was discovered by measuring changes in the star's radial velocity induced by the planet's gravity. Because of its closeness to the parent star, it induced a large wobble which was detected relatively easily. The planet appears to be responsible for enhanced activity in the chromosphere of its star.

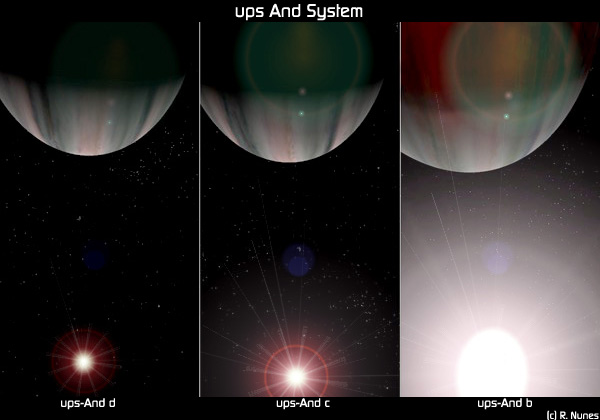
Artist's conception of the planets of Upsilon Andromedae

Even when the first planet was taken into account, there still remained significant residuals in the radial velocity measurements, and it was suggested there might be a second planet in orbit. In 1999, astronomers at both San Francisco State University and the Harvard-Smithsonian Center for Astrophysics independently concluded that a three-planet model best fit the data. The two outer planets were designated Upsilon Andromedae c and Upsilon Andromedae d in order of increasing distance from the star. Both of these planets are in more eccentric orbits than any of the planets in the Solar System (including Pluto). Upsilon Andromedae d resides in the system's habitable zone.

The orbital parameters of this three-planet system have been fully determined. The system is not coplanar, with each other or with the stellar rotation, as in the Solar System. Samh, planet c, has an orbit significantly inclined from those of the other two, and from the perspective of Earth is inclined by only about 8 degrees from the celestial sphere; when it was first discovered, it was thought to have a mass closer to only 2 Jupiter masses due to a comparatively small radial velocity signal. Simulations shows that the measured configuration of the planets produces indeed stable orbits for at least 100 million years, where planets b and d remain roughly coplanar. General relativity is expected to have strong effects on planet b, because it orbits at a distance of just ~0.05 AU from the parent star. The apsides of planet c and d, instead, oscillates with time; the orbit of Upsilon Andromedae c thus returns to a nearly circular state every 9,000 years. The eccentricity of those planets may have arisen from a close encounter between the outer planet and a fourth planet, with the result that the third planet was ejected from the system or destroyed. Such a mechanism could have been triggered by perturbations on the orbit of the companion star, which arise from close encounters with other stars and from the tidal field of the Milky Way. The orbits of the two inner planets seems to be shaped by tidal interactions, while the evolution of c and d orbits is secular.

=== Additional planets ===
Astronomers initially thought that a fourth planet in this system could not exist because it would have made the planetary system unstable and would have been ejected. But in 2007, an island region of stability was reported where a fourth planet could exist.

The existence of further planets too small or distant to detect has not been ruled out, though the presence of Jupiter-mass planets as close as 5 AU from Upsilon Andromedae A would make the system unstable. However, a potential fourth planet (Upsilon Andromedae e) was discovered in 2010. This planet seems to be in a 3:1 resonance with Upsilon Andromedae d. Subsequent studies in 2011 and 2014, while finding some evidence for a fourth planet, found large inconsistencies in the estimated orbital period of Upsilon Andromedae e depending on what dataset was used, suggesting that the apparent planetary signal is more likely to be an instrumental artifact.

If it exists, Upsilon Andromedae e would have a minimum mass slightly greater than Jupiter's and orbit at a similar distance as Jupiter from the Sun, at 5.2456 AU compared to 5.2043 AU for Jupiter. Although only the minimum mass is determined since inclination is not yet known, its true mass might be much greater. It would take over a decade to orbit the star. At an eccentricity of 0.00536, the planet's orbit would be more circular than that of any of the planets in the Solar System.

Upsilon Andromedae does not appear to have a circumstellar dust disk similar to the Kuiper belt in the Solar System. This may be the result of perturbations from the companion star removing material from the outer regions of the Upsilon Andromedae A system.

== See also ==
- 51 Pegasi
- Kepler-56
- List of exoplanets discovered before 2000 - Saffar, Samh and Majriti
- PSR B1257+12
