= 60 Andromedae =

Star system in the constellation Andromeda

- Location of 60 Andromedae (circled)

Observation data Epoch J2000 Equinox J2000
- Constellation: Andromeda
- Right ascension: 02^{h} 13^{m} 13.322^{s}
- Declination: +44° 13′ 53.93″
- Apparent magnitude (V): +4.82

Characteristics
- Spectral type: K3.5 III Ba0.4
- U−B color index: +1.74
- B−V color index: +1.48

Astrometry
Radial velocity (R_{v})	–46.3 km/s
Proper motion (μ)	RA: –20.90 mas/yr Dec.: –14.46 mas/yr
Parallax (π)	5.2634±0.2576 mas
Distance	620 ± 30 ly (190 ± 9 pc)
Absolute magnitude (M_{V})	−1.19

Orbit
Period (P)	748.2±0.4 days
Semi-major axis (a)	2.4±0.6 mas
Eccentricity (e)	0.80
Inclination (i)	54.1±19.9°
Longitude of the node (Ω)	344.5±10.3°
Periastron epoch (T)	37886±11 HJD
Argument of periastron (ω) (secondary)	358±6°
Semi-amplitude (K_{1}) (primary)	4.88 km/s

Details

60 And A
Mass	2.0+0.7 −0.3 M_{☉}
Luminosity	685 L_{☉}
Surface gravity (log g)	1.70±0.44 cgs
Temperature	4,054±42 K
Metallicity [Fe/H]	−0.13±0.12 dex
Age	2.02 Gyr

60 And B
Mass	0.5±0.1 M_{☉}

Other designations
- b Andromedae, BD+43 447, HD 13520, HIP 10340, HR 643, SAO 37867, PPM 44882, IRAS 02100+4359

Database references
SIMBAD	data

60 Andromedae is a star system in the northern constellation of Andromeda, located to the east-northeast of Gamma Andromedae. 60 Andromedae is the Flamsteed designation (abbreviated 60 And), though the star also bears the Bayer designation b Andromedae. It is bright enough to be seen by the naked eye on a dark night, having an apparent visual magnitude of 4.82. Based upon parallax measurements, it is located at a distance of approximately 620 light-years (190 parsecs) from Earth. The system is drifting closer with a heliocentric radial velocity of –46 km/s.

This system is known to have three components. The primary is an aging giant star with a stellar classification of K3.5 III Ba0.4, meaning that an overabundance of singly-ionized barium (Ba^{+} ion) is observed in the spectrum of the star, making it a barium star. This star is about 2 billion years old with double the mass of the Sun. It is radiating 685 times the luminosity of the Sun from its enlarged photosphere at an effective temperature of 4,054 K. The secondary component is likely a degenerate white dwarf with an orbital period of 748.2 days and an eccentricity of 0.34. There is a third component at an angular separation of 0.22 arcseconds.
