= Gamma Andromedae =

Star in the constellation Andromeda

γ^{1} Andromedae (γ Andromedae A)
- Location of γ Andromedae (circled)

Observation data Epoch J2000.0 Equinox J2000.0 (ICRS)
- Constellation: Andromeda
- Right ascension: 02^{h} 03^{m} 53.95229^{s}
- Declination: +42° 19′ 47.0223″
- Apparent magnitude (V): 2.27

Characteristics
- Spectral type: K2+IIb
- U−B color index: +1.58
- B−V color index: +1.37
- R−I color index: +0.68

Astrometry
Radial velocity (R_{v})	−11.7±0.9 km/s
Proper motion (μ)	RA: +42.32 mas/yr Dec.: −49.30 mas/yr
Parallax (π)	8.30±1.04 mas
Distance	approx. 390 ly (approx. 120 pc)
Absolute magnitude (M_{V})	−3.08

Orbit
Primary	γ^{1} Andromedae
Name	γ^{2} Andromedae
Period (P)	4,748 yr

Details
Mass	14.5 M_{☉}
Radius	98.5 R_{☉}
Luminosity	2,987±412 L_{☉}
Surface gravity (log g)	1.03 cgs
Temperature	4,248 K
Metallicity [Fe/H]	−0.06 dex
Rotational velocity (v sin i)	2.1 km/s
Age	6.5 Myr

Other designations
- Almach, Almaach, Almak, Almaak, Alamak, γ^{1} And, γ And A, 57 And A, BD+41 395, FK5 73, GC 2477, HD 12533, HIP 9640, HR 603, SAO 37734, PPM 44721, ADS 1630 A, CCDM J02039+4220A, WDS 02039+4220A

Database references
SIMBAD	data

Gamma Andromedae is a multiple star system in the northern constellation of Andromeda. It is the third-brightest star in the constellation, after Alpheratz and Mirach. Its identifier is a Bayer designation that is Latinized from γ Andromedae, and is abbreviated Gam^{1} And or γ^{1} And, respectively. The system has the proper name Almach, pronounced /ˈælmæk/. Based on parallax measurements, it is estimated to be about 390 light-years distant. The system is drifting closer to the Sun with a radial velocity of −11.7 km/s.

== Observation ==
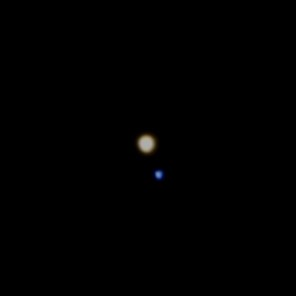
An image of γ Andromedae as it appears in a small telescope

In 1778, German physicist Johann Tobias Mayer discovered that γ Andromedae is a double star. When examined in a small telescope, it appears to be a bright, golden-yellow star next to a dimmer, indigo-blue star, separated by approximately 10 arcseconds. The pair is often considered by stargazers to be a beautiful double star with a striking contrast of color.

The brighter member, γ^{1} Andromedae, is the primary of the system, and is thus designated component γ Andromedae A. It has the official proper name Almach /ˈælmæk/, which was used as the traditional name of the naked eye star, and thus the system as a whole. The fainter secondary is γ^{2} Andromedae or γ Andromedae B. It was later discovered that γ^{2} Andromedae is itself a triple star system. What appears as a single star to the naked eye is thus a quadruple star system.

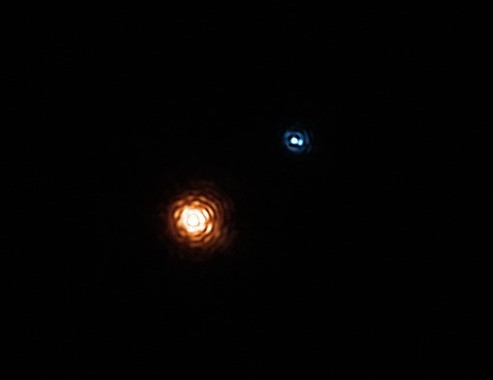
Almach star system showing A, B and C components

== Nomenclature ==
γ Andromedae (Latinised to Gamma Andromedae) is the system's Bayer designation; γ^{1} and γ^{2} Andromedae those of its two constituents. The designations of those constituents as Gamma Andromedae A and B derive from the convention used by the Washington Multiplicity Catalog (WMC) for multiple star systems, and adopted by the International Astronomical Union (IAU). In 2016, the IAU organized a Working Group on Star Names (WGSN) to catalog and standardize proper names for stars. The WGSN approved the name Almach for the component Gamma Andromedae A on 20 July 2016 and it is now so included in the List of IAU-approved Star Names.

Almach was the traditional name (also spelt as Almaach, Almaack, Almak, Almaak, or Alamak), derived from the Arabic العناق (al-‘anāq), "the caracal" (desert lynx). Another term for this star used by medieval astronomers writing in Arabic was رجل المسلسلة (Rijl al Musalsalah), "Foot of The [Chained] Woman". In the catalogue of stars in the Calendarium of Al Achsasi al Mouakket, this star was designated الخامس النعامة (Al Khamis al Na'amah), which was translated into Latin as Quinta Struthionum, meaning the fifth ostrich.

In Chinese, 天大將軍 (Tiān Dà Jiāng Jūn), meaning Heaven's Great General, refers to an asterism consisting of γ Andromedae, φ Persei, 51 Andromedae, 49 Andromedae, χ Andromedae, υ Andromedae, τ Andromedae, 56 Andromedae, β Trianguli, γ Trianguli and δ Trianguli. Consequently, the Chinese name for γ Andromedae itself is 天大將軍一 (Tiān Dà Jiāng Jūn yī, English: the First Star of Heaven's Great General).

In the Babylonian star catalogues, γ Andromedae, together with Triangulum, formed the constellation known as ^{MUL}APIN (𒀯𒀳) "The Plough". Astrologically, this star was considered "honourable and eminent".

== Stellar properties ==
Gamma Andromedae Components

γ^{2} Andromedae (γ Andromedae BC)
Observation data Epoch J2000.0 Equinox J2000.0 (ICRS)
- Constellation: Andromeda
- Right ascension: 02^{h} 03^{m} 54.720^{s} (B)
- Declination: +42° 19′ 51.41″ (B)
- Apparent magnitude (V): 4.84 (BC combined) 5.5 (B); 6.3 (C)

Characteristics
- Spectral type: B9.5V/B9.5V (B) A0V (C)
- U−B color index: −0.12
- B−V color index: +0.03

Astrometry

B
Radial velocity (R_{v})	−14.0±5 km/s
Proper motion (μ)	RA: 30.021 mas/yr Dec.: −51.640 mas/yr
Parallax (π)	9.19±0.73 mas
Distance	350 ± 30 ly (109 ± 9 pc)

Orbit
Primary	γ^{2} And B
Name	γ^{2} And C
Period (P)	63.67±1.0 yr
Semi-major axis (a)	0.302±0.001″
Eccentricity (e)	0.927±0.03
Inclination (i)	109.8±5.0°
Longitude of the node (Ω)	109.6±5.0°
Periastron epoch (T)	2015.5±1.5 MJD
Argument of periastron (ω) (secondary)	183.4±15.0°

Position (relative to γ^{1} And)
Epoch of observation	2004
Angular distance	9.6″
Position angle	63°

Details

Ba
Mass	3.3±0.1 M_{☉}

Bb
Mass	2.4±0.1 M_{☉}

C
Mass	2.6±0.1 M_{☉}

Other designations
- γ^{2} And, γ And BC, 57 And BC, HD 12534, HIP 9640, HR 604, SAO 37735, PPM 44721, WDS 02039+4220BC

Database references
SIMBAD	data

γ^{1} Andromedae A is a massive bright giant star with a spectral classification of K2+IIb. The star has an apparent visual magnitude of approximately 2.26. It has been classified as a candidate post-asymptotic giant branch (AGB) star. However, it does not display a chemical enhancement of s-process elements typical of an AGB star.

The γ^{2} Andromedae BC sub-system, with an overall apparent visual magnitude of 4.84, is 9.6 arcseconds away from γ^{1} Andromedae at a position angle of 63 degrees.

γ^{1} and γ^{2} have an orbital period of approximately 5,000 years.

In October 1842, Wilhelm Struve found that γ^{2} Andromedae was itself a double star whose components were separated by less than an arcsecond. The components are an object of apparent visual magnitude 5.5, γ Andromedae B, and an A-type main-sequence star with apparent visual magnitude 6.3, γ Andromedae C. They have an orbital period of about 64 years and a high eccentricity of 0.927. Spectrograms taken from 1957 to 1959 revealed that γ Andromedae B was itself a spectroscopic binary, composed of two B-type main-sequence stars orbiting each other with a period of 2.67 days. Photometric observations in 2026 revealed that B's components eclipse each other, making it an eclipsing binary. The two orbits may be coplanar. As of 2019, the angular distance between the B and C stars was 0.16 arcsecond.

== Almach as a name ==
USS Almaack (AKA-10) was the name of a United States navy ship.

== See also ==
- NGC 752
