= Chi Andromedae =

Star in the constellation Andromeda

χ Andromedae
- Location of χ Andromedae (circled)

Observation data Epoch J2000.0 Equinox ICRS
- Constellation: Andromeda
- Right ascension: 01^{h} 39^{m} 20.98857^{s}
- Declination: +44° 23′ 10.2299″
- Apparent magnitude (V): +5.01

Characteristics
- Spectral type: G8 III
- U−B color index: +0.55
- B−V color index: +0.883

Astrometry
Radial velocity (R_{v})	+6.54 km/s
Proper motion (μ)	RA: −13.395(126) mas/yr Dec.: 8.635(85) mas/yr
Parallax (π)	12.3592±0.1046 mas
Distance	264 ± 2 ly (80.9 ± 0.7 pc)
Absolute magnitude (M_{V})	+0.59

Orbit
Period (P)	20.8 ± 0.1 yr
Eccentricity (e)	0.368 ± 0.020
Periastron epoch (T)	43,216 ± 60 MJD
Argument of periastron (ω) (secondary)	144 ± 3°
Semi-amplitude (K_{1}) (primary)	3.01 ± 0.09 km/s

Details
Radius	9 R_{☉}
Luminosity	47 L_{☉}
Surface gravity (log g)	2.9 cgs
Temperature	5,070 K
Metallicity [Fe/H]	–0.21 dex
Rotational velocity (v sin i)	0.0 km/s

Other designations
- 52 Andromedae, BD+43°343, FK5 2112, HD 10072, HIP 7719, HR 469, SAO 37406, PPM 44275

Database references
SIMBAD	data

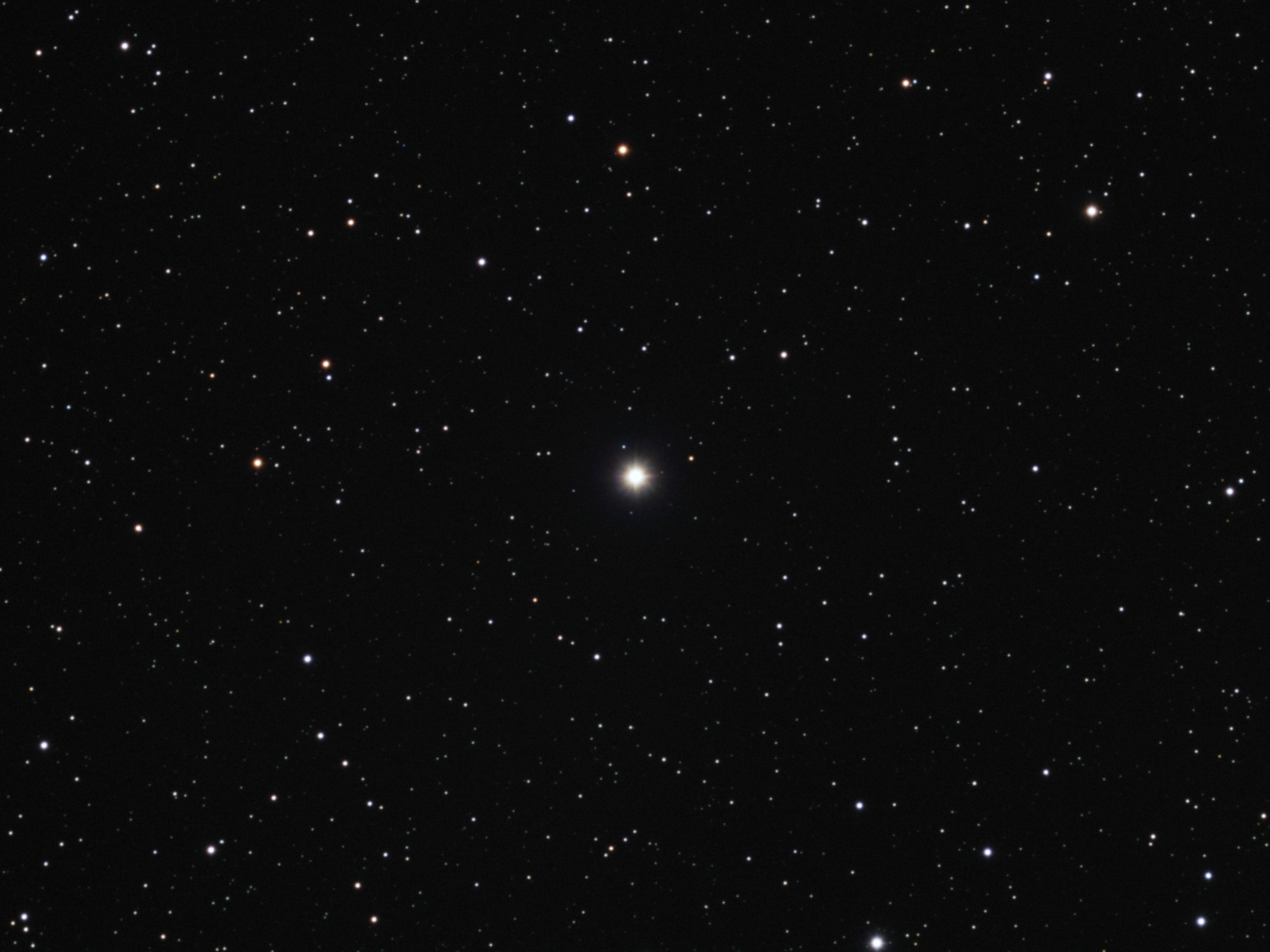
χ Andromedae in optical light

Chi Andromedae (χ Andromedae, χ And) is the Bayer designation for a star in the northern constellation of Andromeda. It has an apparent visual magnitude of +5.01, which is relatively faint for a naked-eye star. Based upon parallax measurements made during the Gaia mission, Chi Andromedae is located around 264 light-years (81 parsecs) from Earth.

χ Andromedae is a member of 天大將軍 (Tiān Dà Jiāng Jūn), meaning Heaven's Great General, together with γ Andromedae, φ Persei, 51 Andromedae, 49 Andromedae, θ Andromedae, τ Andromedae, 56 Andromedae, β Trianguli, γ Trianguli and δ Trianguli. Consequently, the Chinese name for χ Andromedae itself is 天大將軍五 (Tiān Dà Jiāng Jūn wǔ, English: the Fifth Star of Heaven's Great General.)

This is most likely a spectroscopic binary system with an estimated orbital period of 20.8 years and an eccentricity of 0.37. The primary component has a stellar classification of G8 III, which indicates it is a giant star that has exhausted the supply of hydrogen at its core and evolved away from the main sequence. The outer envelope has expanded to about nine times the radius of the Sun and it is radiating 47 times the luminosity of the Sun at an effective temperature of 5,070 K. This heat gives the star the yellow-hued glow of a G-type star. It appears to be rotating very slowly with no measurable projected rotational velocity. The secondary component seems to be a main-sequence star of the spectral class G or K.
