= 32 Andromedae =

Star in the constellation Andromeda

- Location of 32 Andromedae (circled)

Observation data Epoch J2000 Equinox ICRS
- Constellation: Andromeda
- Right ascension: 00^{h} 41^{m} 07.18458^{s}
- Declination: +39° 27′ 31.1895″
- Apparent magnitude (V): 5.30

Characteristics
- Evolutionary stage: horizontal branch
- Spectral type: G8 III
- B−V color index: 0.891±0.004

Astrometry
Radial velocity (R_{v})	−5.1±0.3 km/s
Proper motion (μ)	RA: −14.297 mas/yr Dec.: −3.274 mas/yr
Parallax (π)	9.4654±0.0665 mas
Distance	345 ± 2 ly (105.6 ± 0.7 pc)
Absolute magnitude (M_{V})	0.12

Details
Mass	2.81±0.12 M_{☉}
Radius	12.16±0.51 R_{☉}
Luminosity	90.2±7.2 L_{☉}
Surface gravity (log g)	2.73±0.04 cgs
Temperature	5,107±37 K
Metallicity [Fe/H]	−0.15±0.10 dex
Rotational velocity (v sin i)	1.7 km/s
Age	420±40 Myr

Other designations
- 32 And, BD+38°90, FK5 2043, HD 3817, HIP 3231, HR 175, SAO 54079, PPM 65538

Database references
SIMBAD	data

32 Andromedae, abbreviated 32 And, is a star in the northern constellation of Andromeda. 32 Andromedae is the Flamsteed designation. It is faintly visible to the naked eye with an apparent visual magnitude is 5.30. The distance to 32 And, as estimated from its annual parallax shift of 9.47 mas, is around 345 light years. It is moving closer to the Earth with a heliocentric radial velocity of −5 km/s.

With an age of 420 million years, this is a red giant star with a stellar classification of G8 III, indicating it has consumed the hydrogen at its core and evolved off the main sequence. It has 2.8 times the mass of the Sun and has expanded to 12 times the Sun's radius. The star is radiating 90 times the Sun's luminosity from its enlarged photosphere at an effective temperature of 5,107 K.
