= Omicron Andromedae =

Variable star in the constellation of Andromeda

- Location of ο Andromedae (far right)

Observation data Epoch J2000 Equinox ICRS
- Constellation: Andromeda
- Right ascension: 23^{h} 01^{m} 55.265^{s}
- Declination: +42° 19′ 33.66″
- Apparent magnitude (V): 3.62 (3.55 - 3.78)

Characteristics
- Spectral type: B6III (B6IIIpe + A2p)
- U−B color index: −0.53
- B−V color index: −0.09
- Variable type: γ Cas

Astrometry
Radial velocity (R_{v})	−14.0 km/s
Proper motion (μ)	RA: +22.99 mas/yr Dec.: +0.88 mas/yr
Parallax (π)	4.75±0.53 mas
Distance	approx. 690 ly (approx. 210 pc)
Absolute magnitude (M_{V})	−2.6

Orbit
Primary	A
Name	B
Period (P)	118.0 yr
Semi-major axis (a)	0.304″
Eccentricity (e)	0.340
Inclination (i)	107.4°

Orbit
Primary	Aa
Name	Ab
Period (P)	5.6 yr
Semi-major axis (a)	0.061″
Eccentricity (e)	0.22
Inclination (i)	152.0°

Orbit
Primary	Ba
Name	Bb
Period (P)	33.01 days
Eccentricity (e)	0.24
Semi-amplitude (K_{1}) (primary)	54.8±0.8 km/s
Semi-amplitude (K_{2}) (secondary)	71.6±0.8 km/s

Details

ο And Aa
Mass	6.5±0.5 M_{☉}
Radius	11.5±1.3 R_{☉}
Luminosity	5,300±900 L_{☉}
Temperature	14,540±170 K
Rotational velocity (v sin i)	240 km/s
Age	52±9 Myr

ο And Ab
Mass	4.51 M_{☉}

ο And Ba
Mass	3.74 M_{☉}

ο And Bb
Mass	2.86 M_{☉}
Age	50.1 ± 6.8 Myr

Other designations
- Alfarasalkamil, 1 And, AAVSO 2257+41, BD+41°4664, FK5 869, HIP 113726, HR 8762, SAO 52609, PPM 63726
- ο And A: HD 217675
- ο And B: HD 217676

Database references
SIMBAD	data

Omicron Andromedae, also named Alfarasalkamil, is a star system in the northern constellation Andromeda. Its Bayer designation is Latinized from ο Andromedae, and is abbreviated Omi And or ο And, respectively. Based on parallax measurements, it is located at a distance of approximately 690 light years from Earth. The system as a whole is classified as a blue-white B-type giant, with a typical combined apparent magnitude of +3.62. This is sufficiently bright that the star can be viewed with the naked eye on a dark night.

== Nomenclature ==
This star was in the head of the traditional Arabic constellation Al Faras al Kamil, the Complete Horse, as opposed to Pegasus which is the front half of a horse. The IAU Working Group on Star Names approved the name Alfarasalkamil for Omicron Andromedae Aa on 8 May 2025 and it is now so entered in the IAU Catalog of Star Names.

It was also the brightest star of the obsolete constellation Honores Friderici.

== System ==
Omicron Andromedae is a multiple star containing at least three components. It may consist of two close pairs in a wider orbit, making a four-star system, although the binarity of the primary star is in doubt. This star system has a peculiar velocity of 34.5 ± 5.9 km/s, which qualifies it as a runaway star.

The components A and B were first resolved in 1949, when they were reported to be separated by less than 0.1". In 1975 they were separated by 0.375" and by 2014 by only 0.21". An orbit has been derived with a period of 118 years. The companion is 2.3 magnitudes fainter than the primary star.

In 1975, a companion was discovered by speckle interferometry only 0.05" from component A. Components Aa and Ab orbit every 5.6 years, although the existence of this companion is now doubted.

A spectroscopic binary in the system was suspected and in 1988 it was confirmed. Although a clear 33.01 day period was seen, it was unclear which component was the pair seen in the spectrum. Eventually, it was settled that component B was a close spectroscopic binary.

== Properties ==
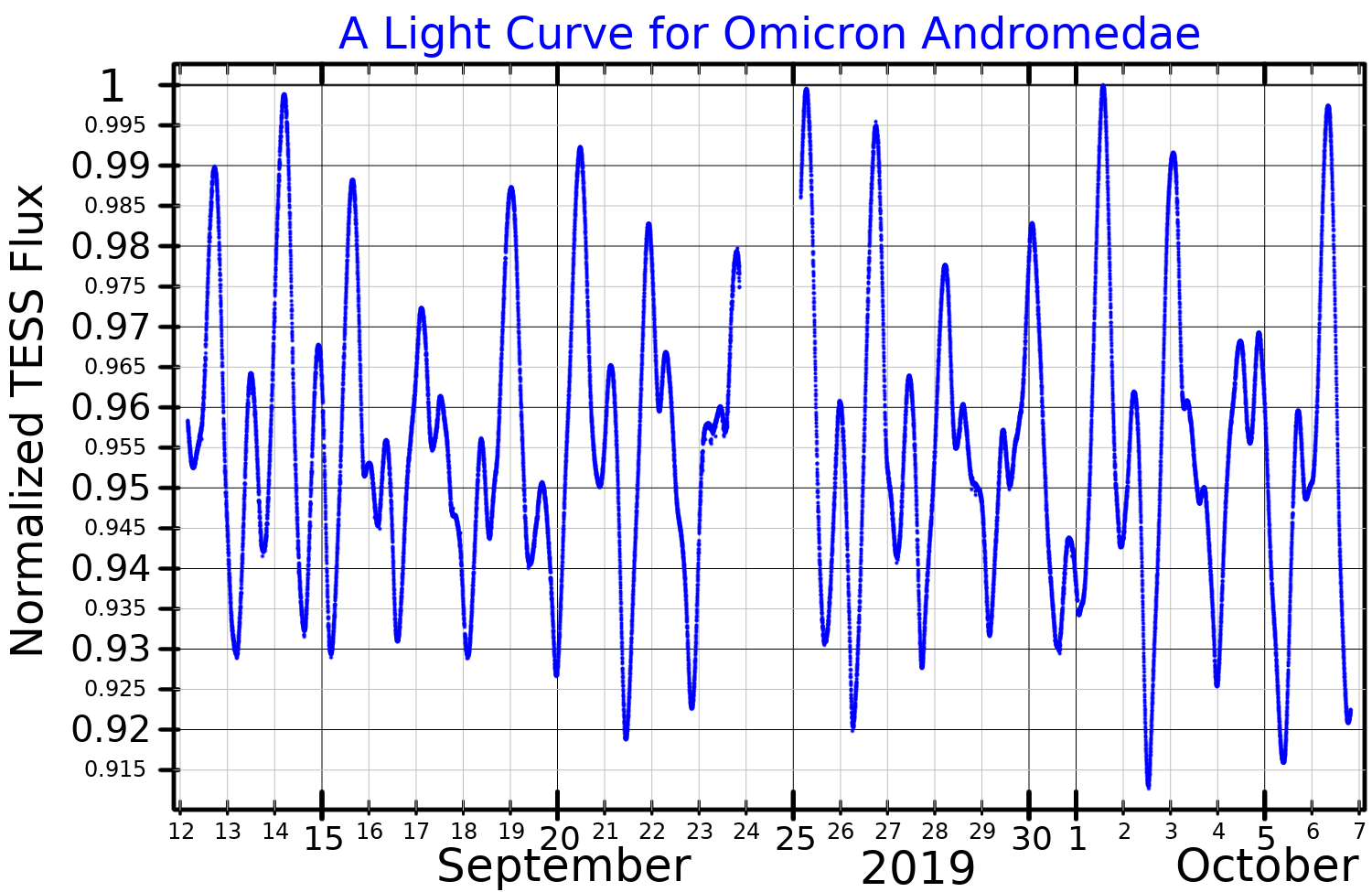
A light curve for Omicron Andromedae, plotted from TESS data

Omicron Andromedae is a Gamma Cassiopeiae type variable star and the system's brightness varies from magnitude +3.58 to +3.78. The variable component is the brightest and most massive star in the system, Aa. Omicron Andromedae also shows variations with a period of about a day, similar to a β Lyrae-type eclipsing variable, but these are thought to be intrinsic to one of the components and not due to eclipses.

The spectrum is predominantly that of a B6 giant star, from the brightest component in the system. It is a shell star and the spectrum contains emission lines with variable profiles. Rapid variations in its spectrum have been reported.

Spectral lines similar to an A2 star are also detectable in the spectrum and these are thought to originate in the B component.
