= Xi Andromedae =

K-type giant star in the constellation Andromeda

- Location of ξ Andromedae (circled)

Observation data Epoch J2000 Equinox J2000
- Constellation: Andromeda
- Right ascension: 01^{h} 22^{m} 20.42008^{s}
- Declination: +45° 31′ 43.5962″
- Apparent magnitude (V): +4.90

Characteristics
- Evolutionary stage: red clump
- Spectral type: K0 IIIb
- U−B color index: +0.98
- B−V color index: +1.08

Astrometry
Radial velocity (R_{v})	−12.59 km/s
Proper motion (μ)	RA: +31.681(102) mas/yr Dec.: +9.024(88) mas/yr
Parallax (π)	14.6042±0.1028 mas
Distance	223 ± 2 ly (68.5 ± 0.5 pc)
Absolute magnitude (M_{V})	0.550

Details
Mass	2.5 M_{☉}
Radius	10 R_{☉}
Luminosity	45.7 L_{☉}
Surface gravity (log g)	2.65±0.11 cgs
Temperature	4,842±92 K
Metallicity [Fe/H]	+0.03 dex
Rotational velocity (v sin i)	0.0 km/s
Age	2.0+2.5 −1.1 Gyr

Other designations
- Adhil, ξ Andromedae, Xi And, ξ And, 46 Andromedae, BD+44 287, FK5 1035, HD 8207, HIP 6411, HR 390, SAO 37155, PPM 43919

Database references
SIMBAD	data

Xi Andromedae is a solitary star in the northern constellation of Andromeda. It has the proper name Adhil /əˈdɪl/; the Bayer designation is Latinized from ξ Andromedae, abbreviated Xi And or ξ And, respectively. The star has an apparent magnitude of +4.9, which is bright enough to be faintly visible to the naked eye at night. Based on parallax measurements obtained during the Gaia mission, it lies at a distance of roughly 223 light-years (68 parsecs) from the Sun. It is drifting closer with a heliocentric radial velocity of –12.6 km/s.

== Nomenclature ==
ξ Andromedae (Latinised to Xi Andromedae) is the star's Bayer designation. It also bears the Flamsteed designation 46 Andromedae. Johann Bayer labeled this star "ξ" in his Uranometria. The star appeared in John Flamsteed's Atlas Coelestis, but was unlabeled. It was later designated as 46 And by Jérôme Lalande. The label "ξ" was used in Atlas Coelestis, apparently erroneously, for what Bayer had labeled "A" (Bayer's A Andromedae has the Flamsteed designation 49 Andromedae).

It bore the traditional name Adhil, which is derived from the Arabic الذيل or að-ðayl "the train" (lit. "the tail"). In 2016, the International Astronomical Union organized a Working Group on Star Names (WGSN) to catalogue and standardize proper names for stars. The WGSN approved the name Adhil for this star on 21 August 2016 and it is now so included in the List of IAU-approved Star Names.

== Properties ==
This is a red clump giant star that has begun generating energy through the fusion of helium at its core, having passed through the red giant branch of its evolution. It has a stellar classification of K0 IIIb, with 2.5 times the mass of the Sun and 10 times the Sun's radius. Xi Andromedae is emitting nearly 46 times as much luminosity as the Sun from its outer envelope at an effective temperature of 4,842 K, giving it the orange-hued glow of a K-type star. It has no measurable projected rotational velocity, although this could mean that the star's pole of rotation is facing in the general direction of the Earth.
