= Zooming In on the Andromeda Galaxy =

2015 composite photograph

- Gigapixels of Andromeda
- The full-resolution mosaic
- Artists: NASA, using the Hubble Space Telescope
- Year: 2015
- Completion date: January 5, 2015
- Type: Panorama
- Subject: Andromeda Galaxy
- Dimensions: 69,536 × 22,230 pixels

Zooming In on the Andromeda Galaxy, also known as Gigapixels of Andromeda, is a 2015 composite photograph of the Andromeda Galaxy produced by the Hubble Space Telescope. It is 1.5 billion pixels in size, and is the largest image ever taken by the telescope. At the time of its release to the public, the image was one of the largest ever taken.

Largest Mosaic of Andromeda by Hubble with details: (a) Clusters of bright blue stars embedded within the galaxy, background galaxies seen much farther away, and photo-bombing by a couple bright foreground stars that are actually inside our Milky Way; (b) NGC 206 the most conspicuous star cloud in Andromeda; (c) A young cluster of blue newborn stars; (d) The satellite galaxy M32, that may be the residual core of a galaxy that once collided with Andromeda; (e) Dark dust lanes across myriad stars.

In late 2011, the Panchromatic Hubble Andromeda Treasury (PHAT) was set up, which was tasked with mapping one-third of the stars within the Andromeda Galaxy. As of 2025, the survey has detected an estimated 200,000,000 astronomical objects using six light filters.

The image depicts the northern side of the Andromeda Galaxy's galactic disc in visible light, and the displayed section is approximately 61,000 light-years across. The image shows the galaxy's 100 million stars of varying types and thousands of star clusters. In the bottom-left of the image is the galaxy's nucleus, and dust lanes are also visible. Several other deep-space objects are visible in the image, including background galaxies. Stars within the Milky Way are also visible, and are typically larger than stars within the Andromeda Galaxy.

The final composite was stitched together using 411 exposures taken from July 2010 to October 2013, and the image was first displayed at the 225th meeting of the American Astronomical Society in Seattle, Washington. The mosaic is the largest and sharpest composite photograph ever taken of the Andromeda Galaxy, and the largest ever taken by the Hubble Space Telescope. At the time of its release, the image was also one of the largest throughout all photographs. The image has been used to help astronomers detect more Andromeda-like spiral galaxies using light.

In 2025, NASA published a huge mosaic made by the Hubble Space Telescope, assembled from approximately 600 separate overlapping fields of view taken over 10 years of Hubble observation. Hubble resolved an estimated 200 million stars that are hotter than the Sun, but still a fraction of the galaxy’s total estimated stellar population. This new mosaic was the result of the December 2021 to January 2024 observations by the Panchromatic Hubble Andromeda Southern Treasury (PHAST) to finish the mosaic started by PHAT 10 years earlier. PHAT covered the northern half of Andromeda.

== See also ==
- COSMOS field
- Hubble Ultra-Deep Field
