= Omega Andromedae =

Binary star system in the constellation Andromeda

ω Andromedae
- Location of χ Andromedae (circled)

Observation data Epoch J2000 Equinox ICRS
- Constellation: Andromeda
- Right ascension: 01^{h} 27^{m} 39.38072^{s}
- Declination: +45° 24′ 24.0651″
- Apparent magnitude (V): +4.83

Characteristics
- Spectral type: F5 IVe or F3 V + F5 V
- U−B color index: +0.00
- B−V color index: +0.42

Astrometry
Radial velocity (R_{v})	+14.7 km/s
Proper motion (μ)	RA: 357.564(127) mas/yr Dec.: −110.039(118) mas/yr
Parallax (π)	34.7332±0.1341 mas
Distance	93.9 ± 0.4 ly (28.8 ± 0.1 pc)
Absolute magnitude (M_{V})	+2.57

Orbit
Period (P)	254.9 days
Semi-major axis (a)	0.038±0.001″
Eccentricity (e)	0.142±0.012
Inclination (i)	62.49±2.10°
Semi-amplitude (K_{1}) (primary)	17.54±0.30 km/s
Semi-amplitude (K_{2}) (secondary)	19.62±0.30 km/s

Details

ω And A
Mass	0.963±0.049 M_{☉}
Radius	2.2 R_{☉}
Luminosity	7.1 L_{☉}
Temperature	6,628 K
Metallicity [Fe/H]	−0.16 dex
Rotational velocity (v sin i)	57.1 km/s
Age	2.1 Gyr

ω And B
Mass	0.860±0.051 M_{☉}

Other designations
- 48 Andromedae, BD+44°307, FK5 1040, HD 8799, HIP 6813, HR 417, SAO 37228, PPM 44006

Database references
SIMBAD	data

Omega Andromedae (ω And, ω Andromedae) is a binary star system in the northern constellation of Andromeda. Parallax measurements made during the Gaia mission make this system to be approximately 93.9 light-years (28.8 parsecs) from Earth. Its apparent visual magnitude is +4.83, which makes it bright enough to be seen with the naked eye.

The primary component has a stellar classification of F5 IVe. The IV luminosity class indicates that it is probably a subgiant star that is in the process of evolving away from the main sequence as the supply of hydrogen at its core depletes. However, Abt (1985) gives a classification of F3 V, suggesting it is an F-type main-sequence star. The measured angular diameter of the primary star is 0.70 ± 0.03 mas. At the system's estimated distance this yields a size of about 2.2 times that of the Sun. It is emitting about seven times solar luminosity from its outer atmosphere at an effective temperature of 6,628 K. This heat gives it the yellow-white-hued glow of an F-type star.

In 2008, the companion star was resolved using adaptive optics at the Lick Observatory. Later observations showed the magnitude difference between the two stars is 3.65 ± 0.03 and they are separated by 0.669 arcsecond. Abt (1985) lists the class as F5 V.
