= Bond (Chinese constellation) =

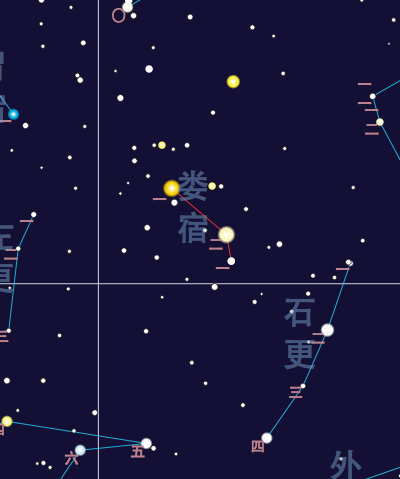
Map of Leu sieu

Leu (or Low) sieu (simplified Chinese: 娄宿; traditional Chinese: 婁宿; pinyin: Lóu Xiù) meaning "the Train of a garment", is one of the twenty-eight lunar mansions of traditional Chinese astronomy. It is one of the mansions of the White Tiger of the West (西方白虎).

== The asterisms in the Region of Leu （婁宿天區） ==
Asterism	Chinese name	Meaning	Modern constellation	Number of stars	Alternative names	Notes	Representing
Leu	婁（娄）	the Train of a garment	Aries	3	天狱, 降婁 （降娄）, 郁车宫		The lasso which was used to hang the sacrificed animal and the sickle for cutting the harvest
Tso Kang	左更	the Left Watch	Aries	5			Forestry manager
Yew Kang	右更	The Right-hand Watch	Pisces	5			Livestock manager
Tien Yuen	天倉 （天仓）	Heaven's Temporary Granary	Cetus	6			Second granary which was used in agriculture and harvesting
Tien Yu	天庾	Heaven's Temporary Granary	Fornax	3			Third granary which was used in agriculture and harvesting
Tien Ta Tseang	天大將軍 （天大将军）	Heaven's Great General	Andromeda; Perseus; Triangulum	11	天將軍, 大將軍, 將軍		The great general of the heavens and ten subordinate officers

== See also ==
- Traditional Chinese star names
