= 49 Andromedae =

Star in the constellation Andromeda

- Location of 49 Andromedae (circled)

Observation data Epoch J2000 Equinox ICRS
- Constellation: Andromeda
- Right ascension: 01^{h} 30^{m} 06.10151^{s}
- Declination: +47° 00′ 26.1811″
- Apparent magnitude (V): 5.269

Characteristics
- Evolutionary stage: red clump
- Spectral type: K0 III
- B−V color index: 0.993

Astrometry
Radial velocity (R_{v})	−11.48 km/s
Proper motion (μ)	RA: −0.950 mas/yr Dec.: −42.638 mas/yr
Parallax (π)	9.7947±0.1166 mas
Distance	333 ± 4 ly (102 ± 1 pc)
Absolute magnitude (M_{V})	0.50

Details
Mass	2.07 M_{☉}
Radius	11 R_{☉}
Luminosity	70.8 L_{☉}
Surface gravity (log g)	2.30 cgs
Temperature	4,879±106 K
Metallicity [Fe/H]	+0.020±0.04 dex
Rotational velocity (v sin i)	2.0 km/s
Age	1.75 Gyr

Other designations
- a And, 49 And, BD+46°370, HD 9057, HIP 6999, HR 430, SAO 37275, PPM 44057, GSC 03282-02272

Database references
SIMBAD	data

49 Andromedae is a star in the constellation Andromeda. 49 Andromedae is the Flamsteed designation (abbreviated 49 And), though it also bears the Bayer designation a Andromedae. It is visible to the naked eye under good viewing conditions with an apparent visual magnitude of 5.269. The distance to 49 Andromedae, as determined from its annual parallax shift of 9.8 mas, is around 333 light-years. It is drifting closer to the Sun with a heliocentric radial velocity of −11.5 km/s.

With an estimated age of 1.75 Gyr years, this is an aging red-clump giant star with a stellar classification of K0 III, indicating it is generating energy by helium fusion at its core. The spectrum displays "slightly strong" absorption lines of cyanogen (CN). It has 2.07 times the mass of the Sun and has expanded to 11 times the Sun's radius. The star is radiating 71 times the Sun's luminosity from its enlarged photosphere at an effective temperature of 4,879 K. It is spinning with a projected rotational velocity of 2 km/s.

This was one of the stars historically known as Adhil, from Arabic að-ðayl "the train [of a garment]", a name now applied to ξ Andromedae. In a 1971 NASA technical memorandum listing star names, 49 Andromedae was listed as Thail, likely derived from the same Arabic name.
