= 56 Andromedae =

Star in the constellation Andromeda

- Location of 56 Andromedae (circled)

Observation data Epoch J2000 Equinox ICRS
- Constellation: Andromeda
- Right ascension: 01^{h} 56^{m} 09.36465^{s}
- Declination: +37° 15′ 06.5986″
- Apparent magnitude (V): 5.69

Characteristics
- Evolutionary stage: red clump
- Spectral type: K0 III
- B−V color index: +1.060

Astrometry
Radial velocity (R_{v})	+61.77±0.13 km/s
Proper motion (μ)	RA: +183.259 mas/yr Dec.: +11.572 mas/yr
Parallax (π)	9.9608±0.0743 mas
Distance	327 ± 2 ly (100.4 ± 0.7 pc)
Absolute magnitude (M_{V})	+0.76

Details
Mass	1.34±0.37 M_{☉}
Radius	11 R_{☉}
Luminosity	56.2 L_{☉}
Surface gravity (log g)	2.58±0.18 cgs
Temperature	4,765±35 K
Metallicity [Fe/H]	−0.15±0.07 dex
Rotational velocity (v sin i)	0.0 km/s
Age	3.16+1.11 −0.82 Gyr

Other designations
- 56 And, BD+36°355, HD 11749, HIP 9021, HR 557, SAO 55107, PPM 66775, WDS J01562+3715A, NLTT 6465

Database references
SIMBAD	data

56 Andromedae, abbreviated 56 And, is a probable binary star system in the northern constellation of Andromeda. 56 Andromedae is the Flamsteed designation. It has a combined apparent visual magnitude of 5.69, which is just bright enough to be dimly visible to the naked eye under good seeing conditions. The distance to this system can be ascertained from its annual parallax shift, measured at 10.0 mas with the Gaia space observatory, which yields a separation of 327 light years. It is moving further from the Earth with a heliocentric radial velocity of +62 km/s and is traversing the celestial sphere at a relatively high rate of 0.183″ per year. This pair is positioned near the line of sight to the open cluster NGC 752, located 1,490 light-years away.

The brighter primary is an aging giant star with a stellar classification of K0 III, having exhausted the hydrogen at its core and evolved off the main sequence. It is a red clump giant, having undergone helium flash and is presently generating energy at its core through helium fusion. The star is about 3.1 billion years old with a negligible observable rotation rate, so the rotation axis of the star is likely pointing towards us. It has 1.3 times the mass of the Sun and has expanded to 11 times the Sun's radius The star is radiating 56 times the Sun's luminosity from its enlarged photosphere at an effective temperature of 4,765 K.

The faint secondary component is a magnitude 11.93 star located at an angular separation of 18.50″ along a position angle (PA) of 77°, as of 2001. This has changed little since 1903 when it was at a separation of 18.4″ along a PA of 80°.
