= NGC 1012 =

Lenticular galaxy in the constellation Aries

- NGC 1012 seen by PANSTARRS

Observation data (J2000 epoch)
- Constellation: Aries
- Right ascension: 02h 39m 14.8890s,
- Declination: +30° 09' 05.896s"
- Redshift: 0.003216
- Heliocentric radial velocity: 986.5±2.8
- Galactocentric velocity: 1120
- Distance: 49.44 Mly
- Apparent magnitude (B): 13.3
- Absolute magnitude (B): -17.6
- Surface brightness: 23.34
- Magnitude (J): 10.31
- Magnitude (H): 9.51
- Magnitude (K): 9.34

Characteristics
- Type: S0/a?

Other designations
- NGC 1012; UGC 02141; KUG 0236+299; CGCG 505-030; CGCG 0236.3+2956; PGC 10051; GC 572; JH 241; WH III 152

NGC 1012 is a lenticular galaxy in the Constellation Aries. It was discovered on September 11, 1784 by William Herschel, and observed again by John Herschel. John Louis Emil Dreyer described it as faint, pretty small, irregularly round, brighter middle, star involved.

NGC 1012 has a diameter (kiloparsec) of 12.79 and has an inclination of 77 ± 4°, indicating it is a small edge-on galaxy.

== Properties ==
In the ALFALFA neutral hydrogen (HI) survey, NGC 1012 is detected to have an integrated neutral hydrogen (HI) flux of 46.39 ± 0.13 Jy km/s (polygon) and 43.76 Jy km/s (pipeline). The HI disk has a diameter of 1.6' and the HI mass is approximately 2.5 × $10^9$ M⊙, indicating it is a gas rich galaxy.

Using Green Bank Observatory's 43m telescope to detect NGC 1012's 21-cm HI profiles found that NGC 1012 has a HI flux of 90.41 Jy km/s, significantly higher than the ALFALFA survey.

NGC 1012 has a stellar mass (log M∗) of 9.14 (1.4×$10^9$M⊙), a star formation rate (SFR) (log SFR) of −0.158 (0.70 M⊙ yr⁻¹) and an X-ray luminosity of log $L_X$ = 39.74 erg/s with a probability of 0.26% that the X-ray emission originates from X-ray binaries, suggesting an active galactic nucleus (AGN) or hot-gas origin. A local AGN survey reported a non-detection for NGC 1012.

Using data from the Gassendi H Alpha survey of Spirals (GHASP), NGC 1012 has a far-ultraviolet flux of 23.0 ± 2.7 × 10⁻¹⁶ W m⁻², indicating hot, young and massive stars within the galaxy. There are two sources within NGC 1012 that is identified as a candidate ultraluminous X-ray source (ULX). The brighter source is near the center of the galaxy, while the dimmer source is far out on the disk. The brighter source has a signal-to-noise S/N of 9.2 and count-based luminosity $L_{cts}$ of 5.7×$10^{39}$ erg/s while the dimmer source has a S/N = 3.8 and $L_{cts}$=1.1×$10^{39}$ erg/s, possibly an intermediate-mass black hole.

== NGC 1023 and LGG 67 Group ==
NGC 1012 is part of a galaxy group known as the NGC 1012 Group or LGG 67. It has at least 3 members, which are NGC 1012, UGC 2017 and UGC 2053.

Another paper states that NGC 1012 is part of a galaxy group known as the NGC 1023 Group, but NGC 1012's systematic velocity is 1120 km $s^{-1}$ and NGC 1023's velocity is 776 km $s^{-1}$, indicating it is probably lying at the near-edge of the NGC 1023 Group.

== Gallery ==
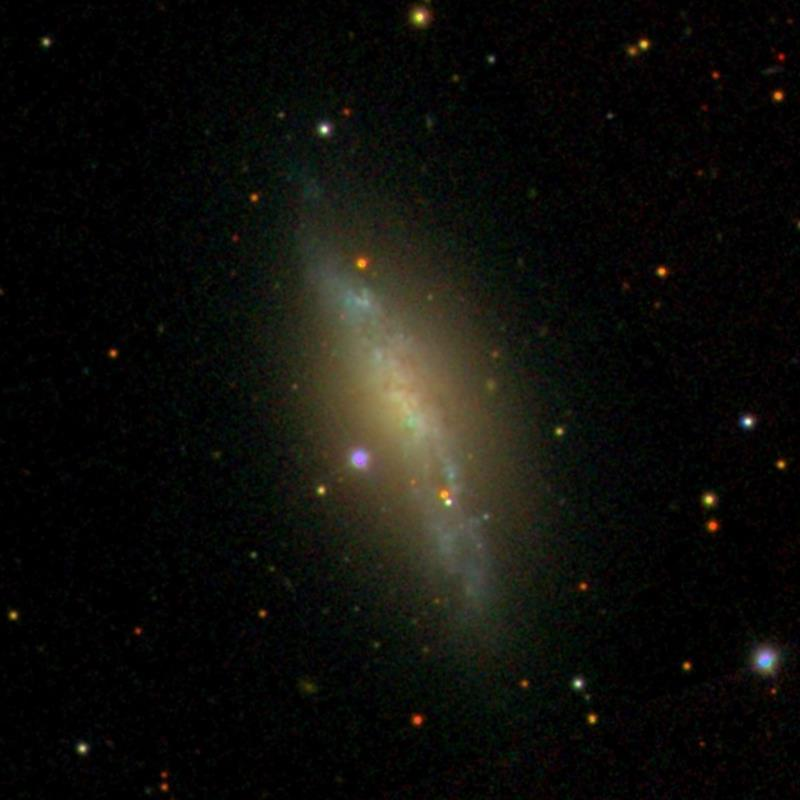
NGC 1012 by Sloan Digital Sky Survey Data Release 14

NGC 1012 by SDSS

NGC 1012 seen by 2 Micron All Sky Survey

NGC 1012 seen by Wide-field Infrared Survey Explorer (WISE)

NGC 1012 seen by Pan-STARRS

== See also ==
- NGC 1000
- NGC 1001
- List of NGC objects (1001–2000)
