= NGC 891 =

Galaxy in the constellation Andromeda

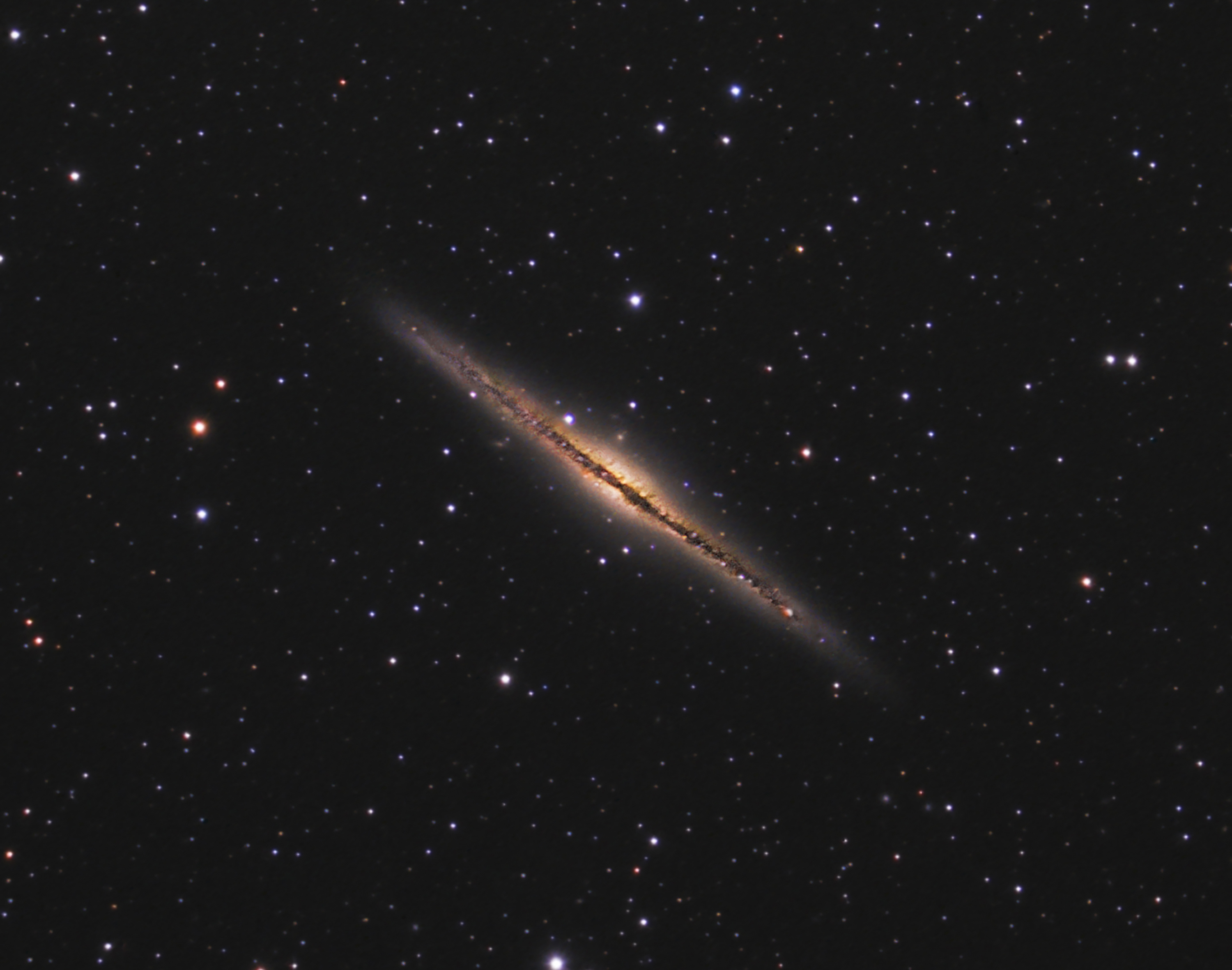
- NGC 891

Observation data (J2000 epoch)
- Constellation: Andromeda
- Right ascension: 02^{h} 22^{m} 33.4^{s}
- Declination: +42° 20′ 57″
- Redshift: 528±4 km/s
- Distance: 27.3 ± 1.8 Mly (8.4 ± 0.6 Mpc)
- Apparent magnitude (V): 10.1

Characteristics
- Type: SA(s)b?
- Size: 130,700 ly (40.1 kpc) (estimated)
- Apparent size (V): 13.5′ × 2.5′

Other designations
- NGC 891, UGC 1831, PGC 9031, Caldwell 23

NGC 891 is an edge-on unbarred spiral galaxy about 30 million light-years away in the constellation Andromeda. Alternatively, it is known as Caldwell 23, the Silver Sliver Galaxy, or the Outer Limits Galaxy. It was discovered by William Herschel on October 6, 1784. The galaxy is a member of the NGC 1023 group of galaxies in the Local Supercluster. It has an H II nucleus.

The object is visible in small to moderate size telescopes as a faint elongated smear of light with a dust lane visible in larger apertures.

In 1999, the Hubble Space Telescope imaged NGC 891 in infrared.

In 2005, due to its attractiveness and scientific interest, NGC 891 was selected to be the first light image of the Large Binocular Telescope. In 2012, it was again used as a first light image of the Lowell Discovery Telescope with the Large Monolithic Imager.

== Supernova ==
One supernova has been observed in NGC 891. SN 1986J (Type IIn, mag. 14) was discovered by J. van Gorkom, M. Rupen, G. Knapp and J. Gunn on August 21, 1986.

== Properties ==
NGC 891 looks as the Milky Way would look like when viewed edge-on (some astronomers have even noted how similar to NGC 891 our galaxy looks as seen from the Southern Hemisphere) and, in fact, both galaxies are considered very similar in terms of luminosity and size; studies of the dynamics of its molecular hydrogen have also proven the likely presence of a central bar. Despite this, recent high-resolution images of its dusty disk show unusual filamentary patterns. These patterns are extending into the halo of the galaxy, away from its galactic disk. Scientists presume that supernova explosions caused this interstellar dust to be thrown out of the galactic disk toward the halo.

It may also be possible that the light pressure from surrounding stars causes this phenomenon.

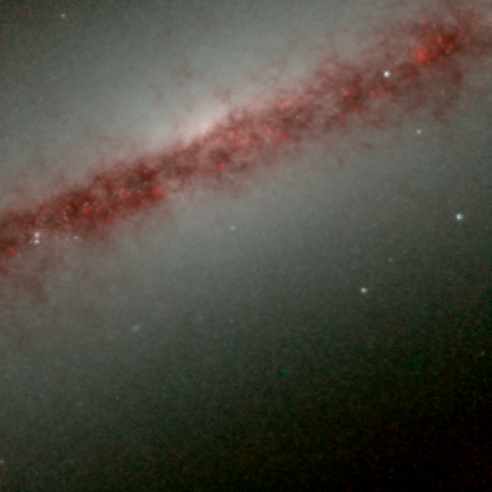
A close-up infrared Hubble Space Telescope (HST) image of NGC 891. Credit: HST/NASA/ESA

The galaxy is a member of a small group of galaxies, sometimes called the NGC 1023 Group. Other galaxies in this group are the NGCs 925, 949, 959, 1003, 1023, and 1058, and the UGCs 1807, 1865 (DDO 19), 2014 (DDO 22), 2023 (DDO 25), 2034 (DDO 24), and 2259. Its outskirts are populated by multiple low-surface brightness, coherent, and vast substructures, like giant streams that loop around the parent galaxy up to distances of approximately 50 kpc. The bulge and the disk are surrounded by a flat and thick cocoon-like stellar structure. These have vertical and radial distances of up to 15 kpc and 40 kpc, respectively, and are interpreted as the remnant of a satellite galaxy disrupted and in the process of being absorbed by NGC 891.

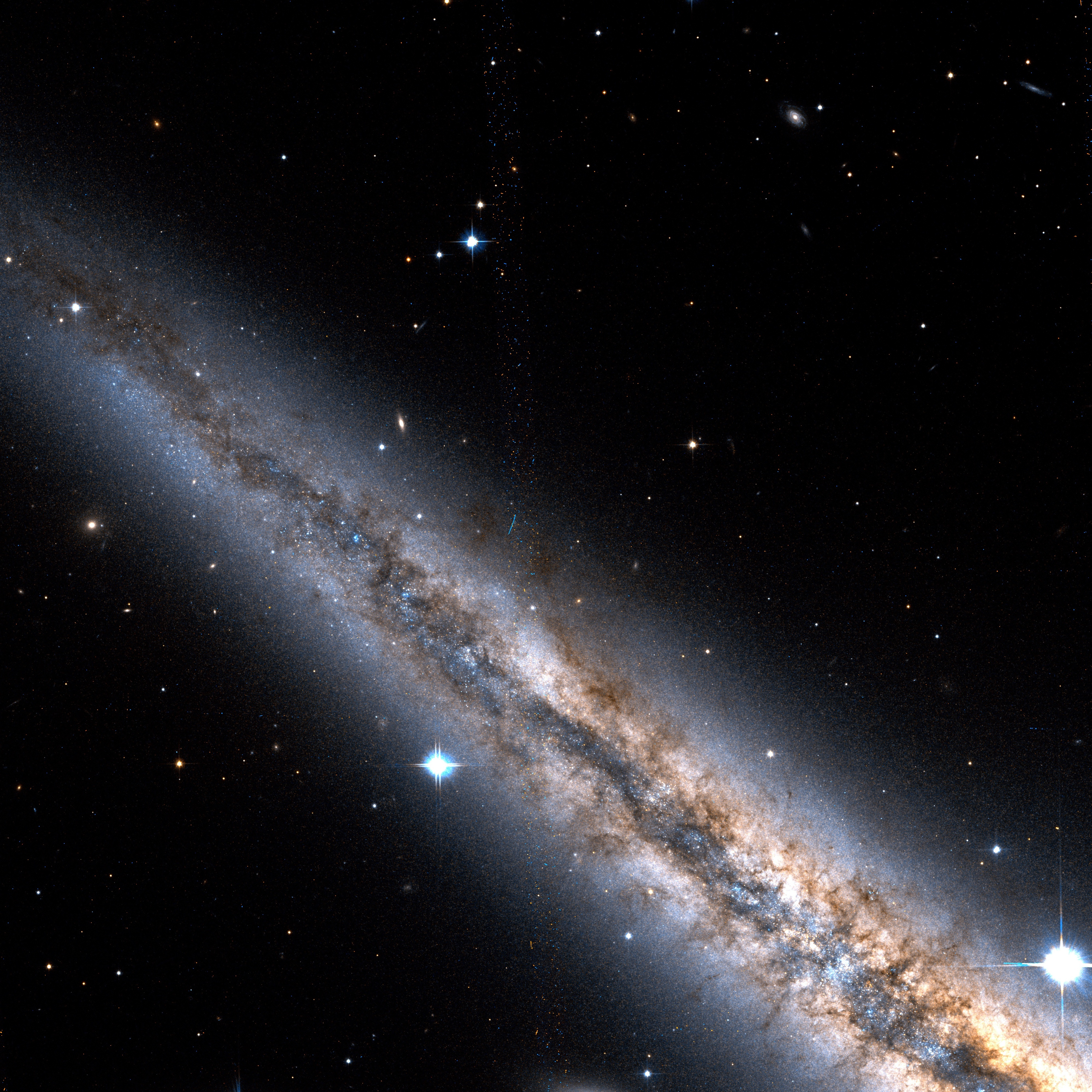
NGC 891 (north part) close-up by HST, 3.24′ view. Credit: NASA/STScI/WikiSky

== In popular culture ==
NGC 891 appears alongside M67, the Sombrero Galaxy(M104), the Pinwheel Galaxy(M101), NGC 5128, NGC 1300, M81, and the Andromeda Galaxy in the end credits of the Outer Limits TV series, which is why it is occasionally called the Outer Limits Galaxy.

The soundtrack of the 1974 film Dark Star by John Carpenter features a muzak-style instrumental piece called "When Twilight Falls on NGC 891".

The first solo album by Edgar Froese, Aqua, also released in 1974, contained a track called "NGC 891". Side 2 of the album, which included this track, was unusual in having been a rare example of a commercially issued piece of music recorded using the artificial head system.

== See also ==
- Messier 82
