= Sabrina Stierwalt =

American extragalactic astrophysicist

- Education: University of California, Berkeley (BA, 2003); Cornell University (MS, 2005; PhD, 2010)
- Children: 2
- Scientific career
- Fields: Astrophysics
- Workplaces: California Institute of Technology; University of Virginia; Occidental College
- Thesis: Environmental Influences on Dwarf Galaxy Evolution: The Group Environment (2010)
- Doctoral advisor: Martha P. Haynes; Riccardo Giovanelli
- Website: sabrinastierwalt.com

Sabrina Stierwalt is an American extragalactic astrophysicist who studies gas dynamics and the formation and evolution of galaxies through surveys utilizing x-ray, ultraviolet, optical, infrared, submillimeter, and radio wavelengths. She is experienced in science communication and advocating for equality and equity for underrepresented groups in science, technology, engineering, and mathematics (STEM) fields.

== Early life ==
Sabrina Stierwalt initially thought about becoming a political speech writer in her early years. Prior to attending college, Stierwalt considered herself to be a "very quiet student" who "didn't ask many questions." She viewed the lack of female scientist role models as a major obstacle in her path to a successful career in STEM.

== Career and research ==
Stierwalt graduated with a Bachelor of Arts degree, double-majoring in both Physics and Astrophysics in 2003 from the University of California, Berkeley, where she first gained an interest in coding and astronomy research. She notes having no female professors to teach her physics courses throughout her undergraduate education. Stierwalt also recalls being one of two girls in a 50-person physics class in which her male peers did not seem to want to collaborate on homework assignments with her.

During her time as a graduate student at Cornell University, Stierwalt co-founded the Graduate Women in Physics organization and was heavily involved in the Arecibo Legacy Fast ALFA (ALFALFA) HI survey. In 2005, she completed a Master of Science degree in Astronomy and Astrophysics for her work focusing on nearby galaxy groups and the search for missing satellite dwarf galaxies using their neutral gas content.

Steirwalt continued her education at Cornell and obtained a Ph.D. degree in 2010. Her thesis was based on the idea that galaxy groups provide information about galaxy evolution that can be applied to other nearby groups, as they "represent a fundamental link between individual galaxies and large scale structures." In her thesis, Stierwalt focused on characteristics of the Leo I Group determined by using the ALFALFA HI survey and compared them to the Local Group. Martha P. Haynes and Riccardo Giovanelli were her thesis advisors.

She went to the California Institute of Technology for postdoctoral work and was a research associate from 2009 to 2012. It was there that she became a member of the Great Observatories All-sky LIRG Survey (GOALS), an effort to understand the processes responsible for star formation and gas dynamics in nearby Luminous Infrared Galaxies (LIRGs).

Stierwalt was a research associate at University of Virginia between 2012 and 2014. She was awarded the Nucleus Grant to design a course for the University of Virginia Astronomy Department called The Origins of Almost Everything for non-astronomy majors in the Fall 2015 semester. In 2014, she was the first astronomer to be awarded the L'Oreal USA for Women in Science fellowship. In 2016, she was named a L'Oreal-UNESCO International Rising Talent.

She is currently leading the survey TiNy Titans (TNT), the first systematic study of gas dynamics and star formation in interacting dwarf galaxies. Mergers between dwarf galaxies are of particular interest to Stierwalt because they are believed to have been more common in the early universe, and thus reveal potentially new implications about how galaxies form and evolve. As of October 2017, TNT has found seven isolated galaxy groups containing only low-mass, dwarf galaxies.

=== Publications ===
Some of Stierwalt's publications include:

- Yong, S., Wang, J., Zhang, Z., Gao, Y., Armus, L., Helou, G., ... Stierwalt, S. (2015). The weak carbon monoxide emission in an extremely metal-poor galaxy, Sextans A." The Astrophysical Journal Letters. 804 (1), 1–4. doi:10.1088/2041-8205/804/1/L11.
- Kirkpatrick, A., Pope, A., Sanjina, A., Roebuck, E., Yan, L., Armus, L., ... Stierwalt, S. (2015). The role of star formation and an AGN in dust heating of z=0.3–2.8 galaxies. I. Evolution with redshift and luminosity. The Astrophysical Journal Letters. 814 (1). 1–24. doi:10.1088/0004-637X/814/1/9.
- Stierwalt, S., Liss, S.E., Johnson, K.E., Patton, D.R., Privon, G.C., Besla, G., ... Putman, M. (2017). Direct evidence of hierarchical assembly at low masses from isolated dwarf galaxy groups. Nature Astronomy. 1. doi:10.1038/s41550-016-0025.

=== Outreach ===
In addition to her academic contributions, Stierwalt is invested in her efforts to increase accessibility and enhance education in STEM, particularly for women and minorities. She believes that "the best thing we can do for women in STEM...is to provide them with role models to show them what is achievable" and strives to be "someone who is not only navigating in a male-dominated field, but doing so without compromising who [she is] while trying to change it."

She is an advocate of the National Astronomy Consortium (NAC) which provides underrepresented students in STEM with research opportunities and mentoring support at the National Radio Astronomy Observatory (NRAO). She also supports the NRAO International National Exchange (NINE) program that offers similar opportunities to students interested in radio astronomy in South Africa and Chile.

She taught students at Learning Works Charter School which provides more personalized opportunities for at-risk students to graduate. Stierwalt is currently an active volunteer who plans and teaches lessons for Dark Skies, Bright Kids, an after-school astronomy program for underserved rural and minority students in elementary and middle schools. Some examples of her involvement in the program are organizing the annual Central Virginia Star Party and bringing an inflatable planetarium to public spaces such as libraries or schools in order to bring astronomy to those that may otherwise not have access to it.

Since 2012, she has hosted the weekly podcast "Everyday Einstein" which aims to increase scientific literacy by providing summaries about everyday science and current scientific news from a wide array of scientific topics to anyone with Internet access.

== Awards and recognitions ==
- NASA Space Grant Graduate Fellowship (2003–2004)
- Alice Cook Award for improving the climate for women at Cornell University (2007)
- Buttrick-Crippen Fellowship for designing and implementing a writing-based physics course for non-science majors (2007–2008)
- Eleanor Norton York Prize for excellence in research, teaching, and service (2007)
- Leister Peer-Awarded Fellowship for academic excellence and leadership (2007)
- NASA Commendation for Outstanding Public Service (2012)
- New Horizons Grant to explore new areas of research outside the mainstream of astrophysics (2014)
- L’Oréal USA Women in Science Fellowship for contributions to STEM and commitment to serving as a role model for younger generations (2014–2015)
- L’Oréal-UNESCO International Rising Talent (2016)
- Cottrell Scholar Award (2025) https://www.oxy.edu/news/prof-sabrina-stierwalt-receives-cottrell-scholar-award
