= NGC 999 =

Galaxy in the constellation Andromeda

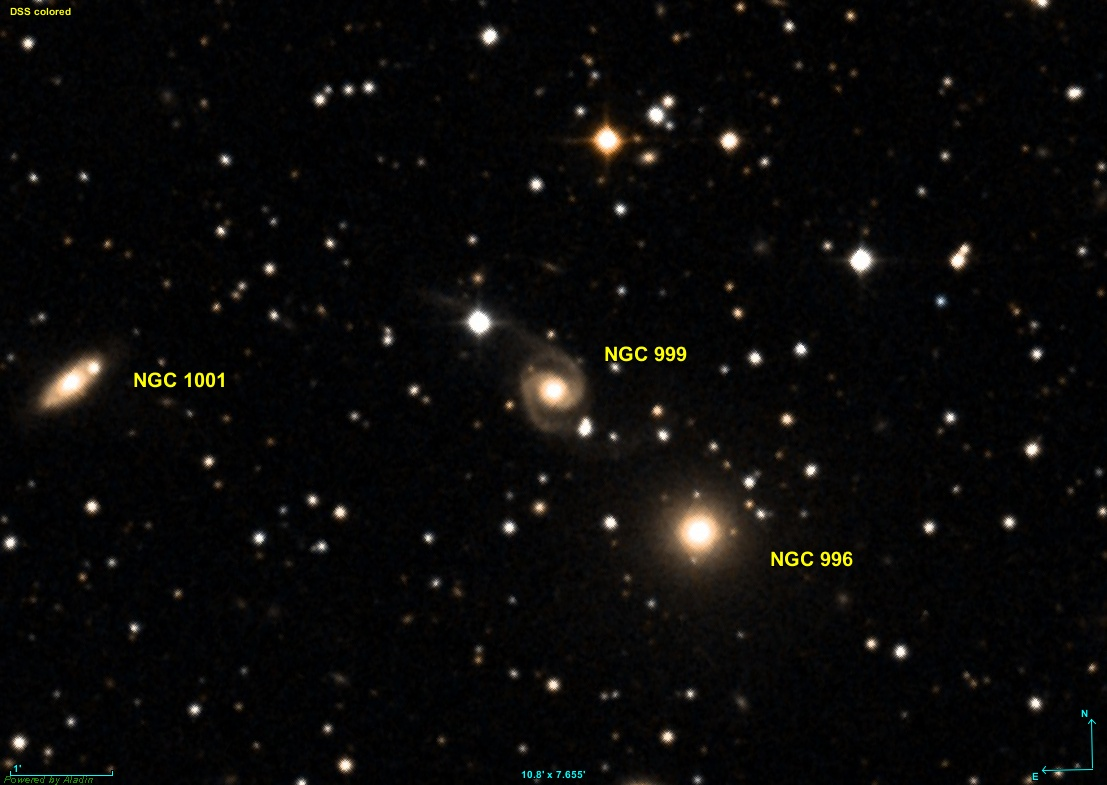
- DSS image of NGC 999

Observation data (J2000 epoch)
- Constellation: Andromeda
- Right ascension: 02^{h} 38^{m} 47.46177^{s}
- Declination: +41° 40′ 13.6652″
- Redshift: 0.015097
- Heliocentric radial velocity: 4492 km/s
- Distance: 195.0 Mly (59.80 Mpc)
- Apparent magnitude (B): 14.5

Characteristics
- Type: (R')SAB(s)a

Other designations
- UGC 2127, MCG +07-06-047, PGC 10026, CGCG 539-066

NGC 999 is an intermediate spiral galaxy located in the constellation Andromeda about 195 million light-years from the Milky Way. It was discovered by French astronomer Edouard Stephan on 8 December 1871.

== See also ==
- List of NGC objects (1–1000)
- NGC 1001
- NGC 996
