= IC 239 =

Galaxy in the constellation Andromeda

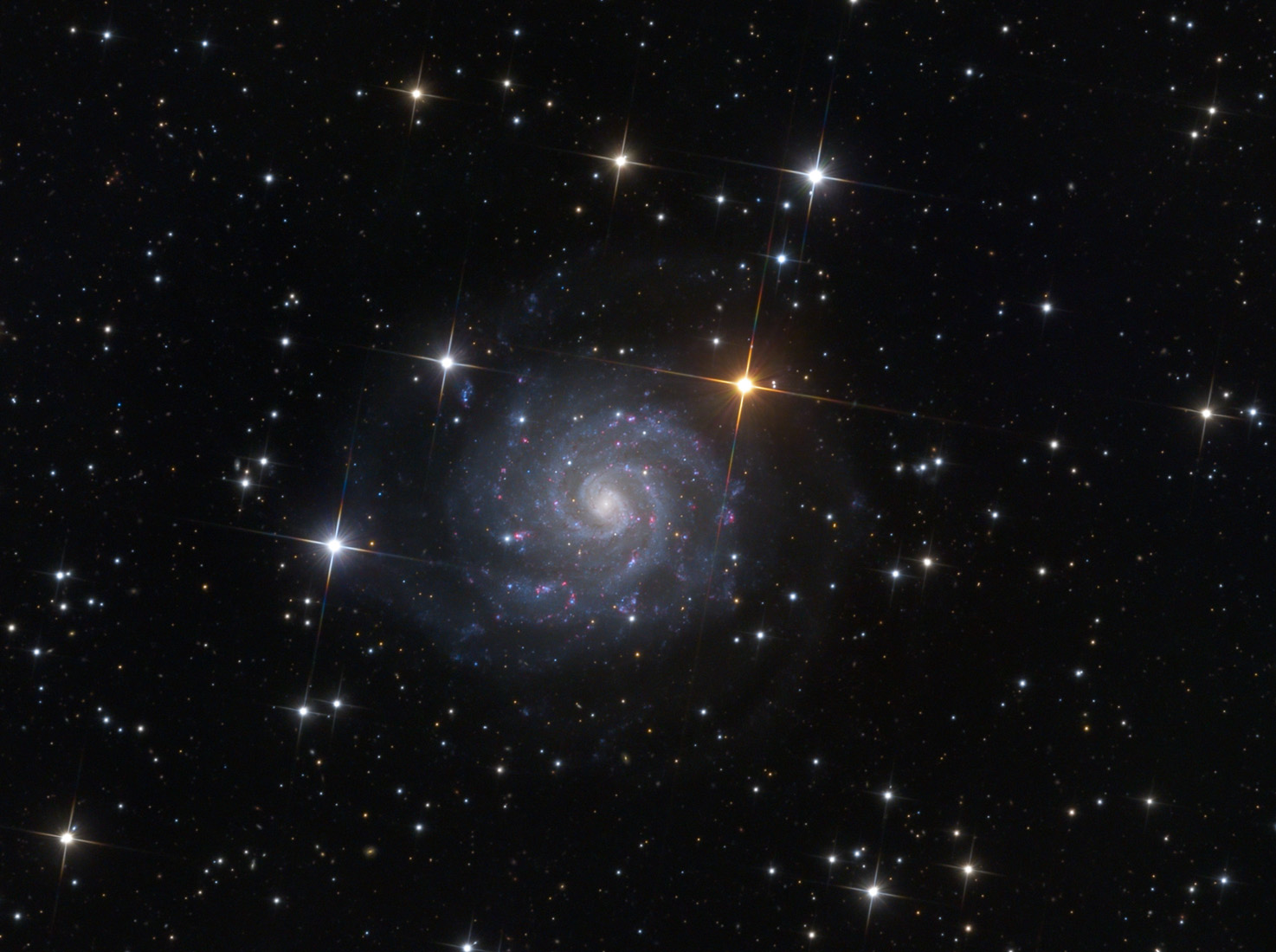
- IC 239 imaged by the 32-inch Schulman Telescope of Mount Lemmon Observatory

Observation data (J2000 epoch)
- Constellation: Andromeda
- Right ascension: 02^{h} 36^{m} 27.8^{s}
- Declination: +38° 58′ 09″
- Redshift: 0.002979 ± 0.000003
- Heliocentric radial velocity: 893 ± 1 km/s
- Distance: 36.8 ± 5.1 Mly (11.3 ± 1.6 Mpc)
- Apparent magnitude (V): 11.0

Characteristics
- Type: SAB(rs)cd
- Apparent size (V): 4.6′ × 4.2′

Other designations
- UGC 2080, CGCG 523-071, MCG +06-06-065, IRAS 02333+3845, PGC 9899

IC 239 is a spiral galaxy in the constellation Andromeda. The galaxy lies about 35 million light years away from Earth, which means, given its apparent dimensions, that IC 239 is approximately 50,000 light years across. It was discovered by Isaac Roberts in 1893.

== Characteristics ==
The galaxy is seen nearly face on. The bulge of the galaxy is small and embedded in a thick bar. From its end of the bar emerge two low surface brightness arms that can be traced for half a revolution before fading, with a grand design pattern. The galaxy also has a faint outer third arm. The galaxy has a hydrogen I disk which extends for about twice the optical radius of the galaxy and appears warped. However the galaxy doesn't appear to be interacting with other galaxies.

== Nearby galaxies ==
IC 239 is located in the vicinity of the NGC 1023 Group. Garcia considered the galaxy to be a member of the group, also known as LGG 70, along with NGC 1023 and NGC 1003. The angular separation of NGC 1023 and IC 239 is 47 arcminutes, while DDO 22 is located 45 arcminutes to the west.

However the galaxy, although appearing centrally in the group in the sky, has a radial velocity higher than that of the other members of the group, indicating it is lying in the background. Makarov and Karachentsev consider the galaxy a member of the IC 239 group, along with NGC 1023C, and is located in the same galaxy cloud with NGC 1023 and its group.
