= Amélie Saintonge =

Canadian astrophysicist

Amélie Saintonge (born 1980) is a Canadian astrophysicist, a professor of astrophysics at University College London in England, and a director at the Max Planck Institute for Radio Astronomy in Bonn, Germany. Her research involves the use of radio astronomy to study star formation and its effects on galaxy evolution and the depletion of the interstellar medium.

== Education and career ==
Saintonge was born in Montreal in 1980; her parents were both academics, in physics and mathematics education. After attending French-language Catholic schools in Montreal, including the Collège Notre-Dame du Sacré-Cœur and the Collège Jean-de-Brébeuf, she became an undergraduate student of mathematics and physics at the Université de Montréal. and spent two summers at the NRC Herzberg Astronomy and Astrophysics Research Centre in Victoria, British Columbia before graduating in 2002. She went to Cornell University in the US for graduate study at Cornell University, where her doctoral research involved the ALFALFA survey at the Arecibo Observatory. Her 2008 doctoral dissertation, Properties of low mass dwarf galaxies in the ALFALFA survey, was supervised by Riccardo Giovanelli.

After postdoctoral research at the University of Zurich in Switzerland, Saintonge became a researcher at two Max Planck Institutes, the Max Planck Institute for Astrophysics and the Max Planck Institute for Extraterrestrial Physics, both located near Munich. She became a lecturer of astrophysics at University College London and a Royal Society University Research Fellow in 2013, later becoming a professor at University College London. In 2024, she took up the directorship of the Department of Star Formation and Galaxy Evolution at the Max Planck Institute for Radio Astronomy.

== Recognition ==
Saintonge was the 2018 recipient of the Fowler Award for Early Achievement in Astronomy of the Royal Astronomical Society.

== Personal life ==
Saintonge has also worked as a chamber musician and amateur opera singer.
