= SN 1986J =

Type IIn supernova

- Event type: Supernova
- SN.II
- Date: 1983?
- Instrument: Very Large Array
- Constellation: Andromeda
- Right ascension: 02^{h} 22^{m} 31.33^{s}
- Declination: +42° 19′ 56.4″
- Epoch: J2000
- Distance: 32.3 ± 1.6 Mly (9.91 ± 0.50 Mpc)
- Host: NGC 891
- Progenitor type: red supergiant

SN 1986J was a Type IIn supernova event in NGC 891, which is an edge-on unbarred spiral galaxy in the constellation Andromeda. NGC 891 is located at a distance of approximately 32 million light-years (9.9 Mpc) from the Milky Way. SN 1986J was discovered August 21, 1986 using the Very Large Array radio telescope, about three years after the initial explosion.

== Observations ==
On August 21, 1986, the discovery of a candidate radio supernova was announced, with the detection being made using the Very Large Array radio telescope. Designated SN 1986J, in the radio band this was the brightest and most luminous supernova found to that date. It was located at a distance of around 25 kly (7.7 kpc) from the center of NGC 891, and under 550 ly (170 pc) from the galactic plane. Visually, the object showed as a 20th magnitude point source with a spectrum similar to a late stage Type II supernova.

A search through prediscovery data showed this object had been recorded by the Whipple Observatory on December 29, 1983. At the time, the spectrum was dominated by Hydrogen-alpha lines. The decline of the radio light curve suggested the event had occurred in 1982 or 1983; hence around three years before discovery. Because the host galaxy NGC 891 is being seen nearly edge-on, the energy output is experiencing an extinction of 1.5–2 magnitudes due to interstellar dust. The observed properties of SN 1986J appeared similar to SN 1961V, then classified as a "Type V" supernova. The high level of radio emission from SN 1986J suggested the supernova ejecta is colliding with a massive circumstellar wind.

Observations using VLBI in 1986 and 1987 showed a deviation from spherical symmetry in the expanding gas. By assuming linear expansion, an explosion date of September 1982 was found from the VLBI data, with a one year margin of error. In 1991, X-ray emission was detected from the supernova using the ROSAT space telescope. This emission was successfully modeled by collision between the expanding gas explosion and the pre-existing, potentially clumpy circumstellar wind. By 2002, detailed VLBI study showed a distorted, radio-emitting shell around the explosion site. The asymmetry in the shape was believed due to collision between the ejecta and an anisotropic medium. The mass of the ejected envelope was estimated to be at least 12 M_{☉}, along with ~2.2 M_{☉} in swept-up matter.

After sixteen years, the expansion velocity had slowed to 6,000 km/s from an estimated initial velocity of 20,000 km/s. The radio spectrum began showing indications that a pulsar nebula was becoming visible. During 2002–2003, a compact central radio component began to emerge in a VLBI study. This was deemed evidence for a neutron star or black hole remnant. If so, it would be the youngest such object ever found, and thus of interest for further study. An alternative scenario is of a dense condensation in the interstellar medium that is being impacted by the explosion, and is coincidentally aligned with the eruption point.

The progenitor star was estimated to be a red supergiant with at least 20 solar masses, and possibly as high as 30 to 60 solar masses. Prior to its explosion, the star underwent rapid mass loss, creating a clumpy circumstellar medium.
