= Stanley E. Whitcomb =

American physicist

Stanley Ernest Whitcomb (born January 23, 1951, in Denver) is an American physicist and was the chief scientist at the Laser Interferometer Gravitational-Wave Observatory (LIGO) project when the first direct detection of gravitational waves was made in September 2015.

== Education and career ==
In 1973 Whitcomb graduated with a bachelor's degree physics from Caltech. After a year at the University of Cambridge, he became a physics graduate student at the University of Chicago, where he graduated with a Ph.D. in 1980. His dissertation, supervised by Roger Hildebrand, dealt with astronomy in the far infrared and sub-millimeter wavelengths. In the autumn of 1980 Whitcomb became an assistant professor at Caltech.

Whitcomb joined the gravitational wave effort in 1980 and participated in the early experimental work that proved the feasibility of making such precise measurements. He led the team within the LIGO Laboratory that designed and commissioned the first generation full-scale LIGO detectors. At one point or another, he was involved in virtually every aspect of LIGO’s work.

Kip Thorne and Ronald Drever were the earliest leaders of Caltech's pioneering gravitational wave program. Whitcomb, Siu Au Lee, Robert E. Spero, and Mark Hereld were among the program's first five recruits. In 1985 Whitcomb moved to Northrop Corporation as a research engineer in the electronics division and then became a project manager. From 1989 to 1991 he was a senior system specialist at Loral Electro-Optical Systems. In 1991 he returned to LIGO as deputy director under Director Rochus "Robbie" Vogt, who in 1987 had taken charge of the joint LIGO Project between MIT (where Rainer Weiss worked on laser interferometers) and Caltech. In September 2015 Whitcomb officially retired from LIGO but continued to make various contributions to the project.

In 2002 Whitcomb was elected a fellow of the American Physical Society (APS). He was elected a Fellow of The Optical Society in 2012. He has received several awards. He received, jointly with Barry Barish, the Henry Draper Medal in 2017. In 2019, he received OSA's C.E.K. Mees Medal.
