= Derek Vonberg =

British electrical engineer (1921–2015)

Derek Vonberg CBE (1921–2015) was a British electrical engineer, radio astronomer, and medical research scientist.

Vonberg studied at Imperial College. In 1942, he worked at the Telecommunications Research Establishment (TRE) in Malvern, on the development of RADAR. After the war, he joined the Cavendish Laboratory in 1945, where he worked with Martin Ryle.

In the late 1940s, Vonberg joined the Cyclotron Group at Hammersmith Hospital.

Vonberg was appointed a Commander of the Order of the British Empire in the 1980 Birthday Honours.
