= NGC 925 =

Galaxy in the constellation Triangulum

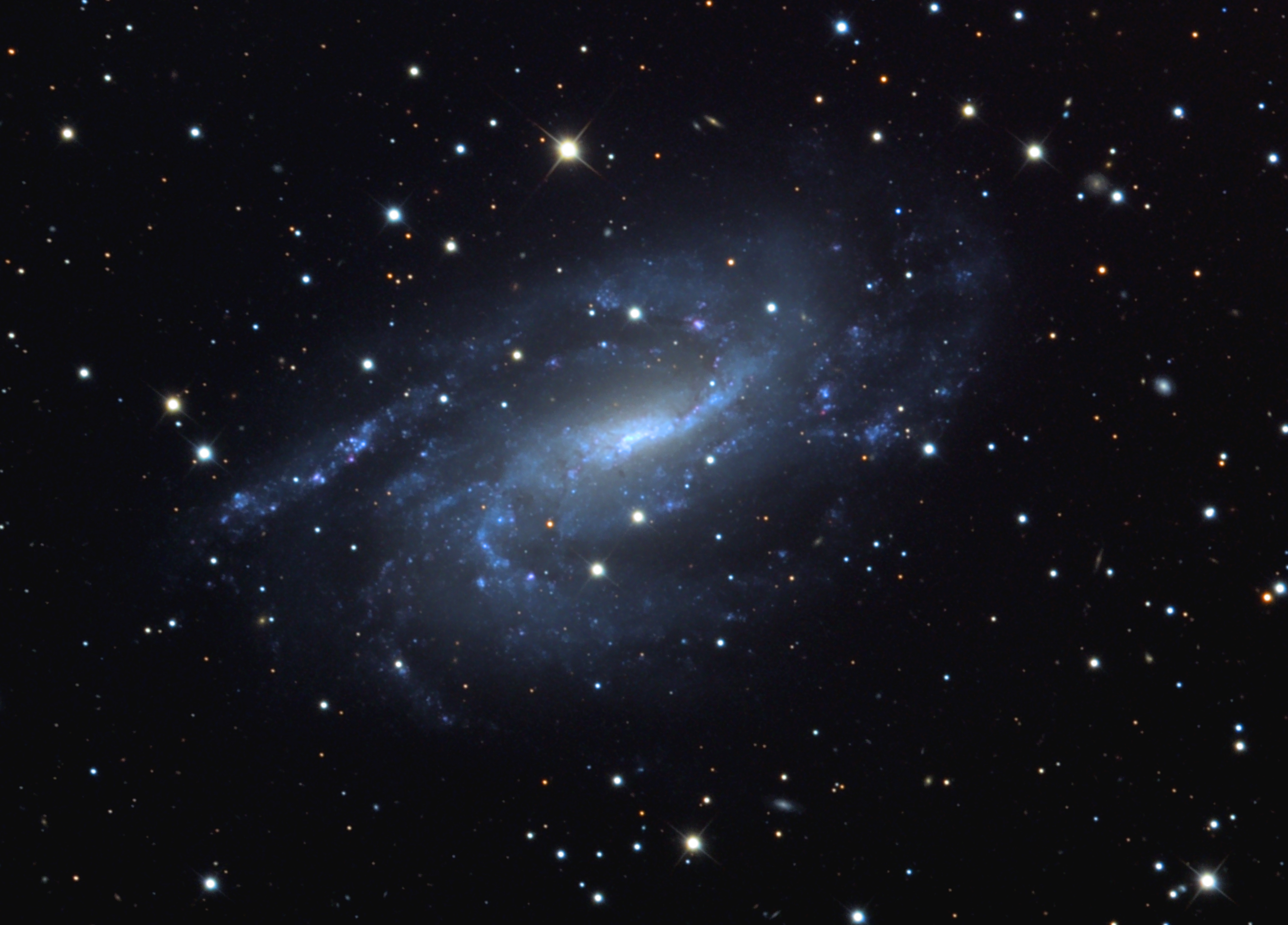
- NGC 925 imaged with the 32 inch telescope at Mount Lemmon Observatory

Observation data (J2000 epoch)
- Constellation: Triangulum
- Right ascension: 02^{h} 27^{m} 16.913^{s}
- Declination: +33° 34′ 43.97″
- Redshift: 553 ± 3 km/s
- Heliocentric radial velocity: 564 km/s
- Distance: 30.3 ± 2.3 million light years (9.29 ± 0.69 Mpc)
- Group or cluster: NGC 1023 Group
- Apparent magnitude (V): 10.7

Characteristics
- Type: SB(s)d
- Apparent size (V): 10′.5 × 5′.9

Other designations
- IRAS 02243+3321, UGC 1913, MCG +05-06-045, PGC 9332, CGCG 504-085

NGC 925 is a barred spiral galaxy located about 30 million light-years away in the constellation Triangulum. German-British astronomer William Herschel discovered this galaxy on 13 September 1784.

The morphological classification of this galaxy is SB(s)d, indicating that it has a bar structure and loosely wound spiral arms with no ring. The spiral arm to the south is stronger than the northern arm, with the latter appearing flocculent and less coherent. The bar is offset from the center of the galaxy and is the site of star formation all along its length. Both of these morphological traits—a dominant spiral arm and the offset bar—are typically characteristics of a Magellanic spiral galaxy. The galaxy is inclined at an angle of 55° to the line of sight along a position angle of 102°.

The NGC 925 is a member of the NGC 1023 Group, a nearby, gravitationally-bound group of galaxies associated with NGC 1023. However, the nearest member lies at least 650,000 ly (200,000 pc) distant from NGC 925. There is a 10 million solar mass (M_{☉}) cloud of neutral hydrogen attached to NGC 925 by a streamer. It is uncertain whether this is a satellite dwarf galaxy, the remnant of a past tidal interaction, or a cloud of primordial gas.

Although no supernovae have been observed in NGC 925 yet, a luminous red nova, designated AT 2023nzt (type LRN, mag. 19), was discovered by ATLAS on 26 July 2023.
