= L. P. Ladouceur =

American football player (born 1981)

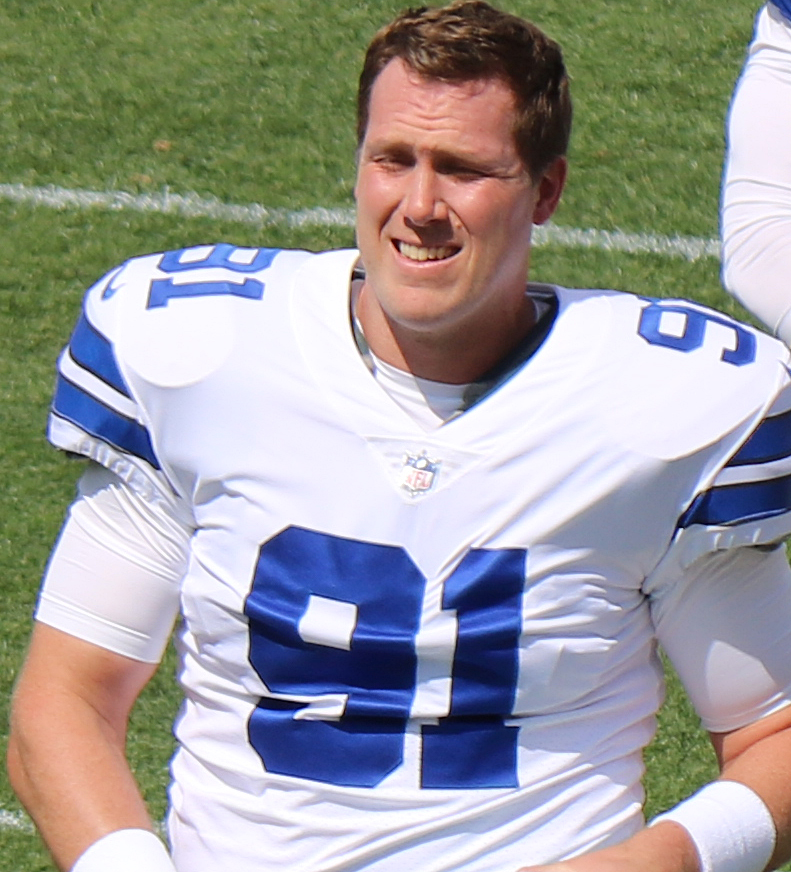
- Ladouceur with the Dallas Cowboys in 2017

No. 91
- Position: Long snapper

Personal information
- Born: March 13, 1981 (age 45); Montreal, Quebec, Canada
- Listed height: 6 ft 5 in (1.96 m)
- Listed weight: 255 lb (116 kg)

Career information
- High school: Collège Notre-Dame (Montreal)
- College: California
- NFL draft: 2005: undrafted
- CFL draft: 2004: 4th round, 29th overall pick

Career history
- New Orleans Saints (2005)*; Dallas Cowboys (2005–2020)
- * Offseason or practice squad member only

Awards and highlights
- Pro Bowl (2014); NFL records: Most games by a Canadian-born player (253); Most consecutive games by a long snapper (253); Most Consecutive snaps by a long snapper (2300+); Most Consecutive games played for one team by a special teams player (253)

Career NFL statistics
- Games played: 253
- Total tackles: 21
- Fumble recoveries: 1
- Stats at Pro Football Reference

Louis-Philippe Ladouceur (LAH-doo-sahr; born March 13, 1981) is a Canadian-American former professional football player who spent his entire 16-year career as a long snapper with the Dallas Cowboys of the National Football League (NFL). Born and raised in Montreal, he played college football in the United States for the California Golden Bears. He signed as an undrafted free agent with the New Orleans Saints in 2005, before joining the Cowboys that same year.

Ladouceur holds several longevity records for both the Cowboys and the NFL, including most consecutive games played in Cowboys history, most seasons played in Cowboys history, most consecutive games played by a long snapper in NFL history, and most games played by a Canadian-born player.

== Early life ==
Ladouceur attended Notre Dame High School in Montreal, Quebec. He went on to play as a defensive lineman for John Abbott College, which is a public college, where as a senior he recorded seven sacks, 48 tackles, and one fumble recovery.

He accepted a football scholarship from the University of California, Berkeley. He also received scholarship offers from Syracuse University and Michigan State University. In his first 2 seasons he appeared in only 5 games. As a junior, he was named the team's long snapper and was a key player on a special teams unit that did not allow a blocked kick in two straight years.

Ladouceur was selected in the fourth round of the 2004 CFL draft by the Ottawa Renegades, but decided to return to school.

== Professional career ==
Pre-draft measurables
Height	Weight	40-yard dash	20-yard shuttle	Three-cone drill	Vertical jump	Broad jump	Bench press
6 ft 5 1/8 in (1.96 m)	257 lb (117 kg)	4.92 s	4.48 s	7.40 s	33.0 in (0.84 m)	9 ft 3 in (2.82 m)	18 reps
All values from Pro Day

=== New Orleans Saints ===
Ladouceur was signed as an undrafted free agent by the New Orleans Saints after the 2005 NFL draft on April 27. He was waived on August 29.

=== Dallas Cowboys ===
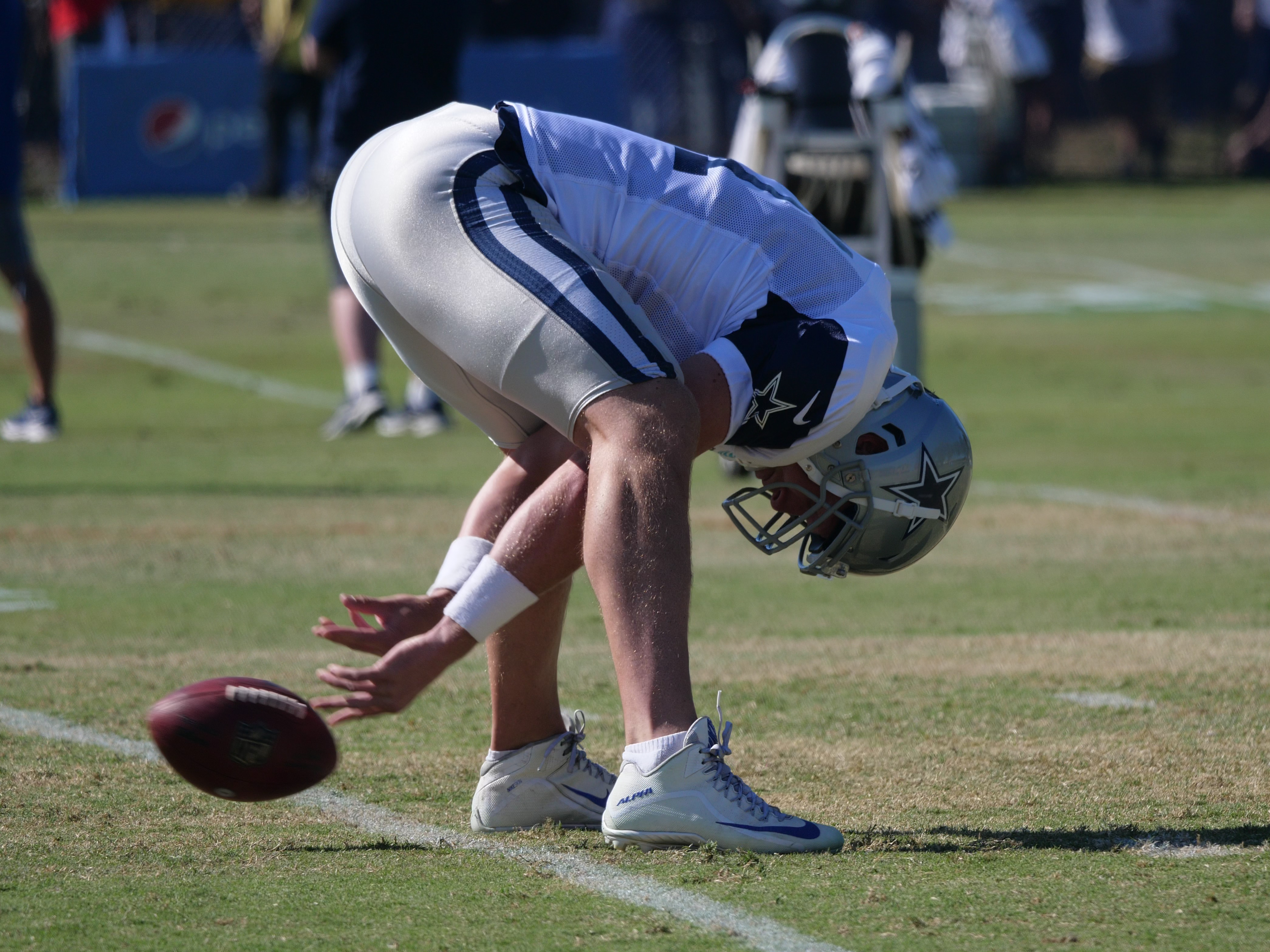
Ladouceur with the Cowboys in 2019

After playing the third game of the 2005 season against the San Francisco 49ers, the Cowboys decided to stay the entire week in California, to better prepare for their next game against the Oakland Raiders. Because of issues they were having with rookie long snapper Jon Condo, the team decided to replace him with Ladouceur, who signed with the team on September 28. In his NFL debut against the Oakland Raiders, he snapped cleanly on five punts and two field goals. He finished his rookie season with clean snaps on 70 punts, 25 field goals and 28 PATs.

On February 14, 2008, he signed a five-year contract through the 2012 season. On February 28, 2013, he signed a new five-year contract. In 2014, he was added to the Pro Bowl as a "need player" for special teams purposes.

On March 18, 2018, Ladouceur re-signed with the Cowboys. On March 19, 2019, Ladouceur re-signed with the Cowboys.

On March 24, 2020, Ladouceur signed a one-year contract with the Cowboys. He tied the franchise record of playing in 16 seasons, shared with tight end Jason Witten. On December 13, 2020, he became just the third player in NFL history to play 250 consecutive games for one team. On December 20, he played in his 251st career NFL game, moving him past kicker Eddie Murray as the most ever by a Canadian-born player. He was congratulated by Canada's Prime Minister Justin Trudeau.

On March 15, 2021, it was reported in the media that the Cowboys would not re-sign Ladouceur to play for them in a 17th season. He was replaced with free agent acquisition Jake McQuaide.

At the time of his departure, Ladouceur was the last active NFL player to have played under Bill Parcells, as well as the last active Cowboy that played a game at Texas Stadium.

Ladouceur retired from the NFL in November 2021, but did not make his decision public until February 2022.

== Personal life ==
Ladouceur married his wife, Brooke Worthington, in April 2012. He became an American citizen in 2019 after starting the process in 2013.
