= Martin Ryle =

English radio astronomer (1918–1984)

Professor Sir Martin Ryle FRS FREng
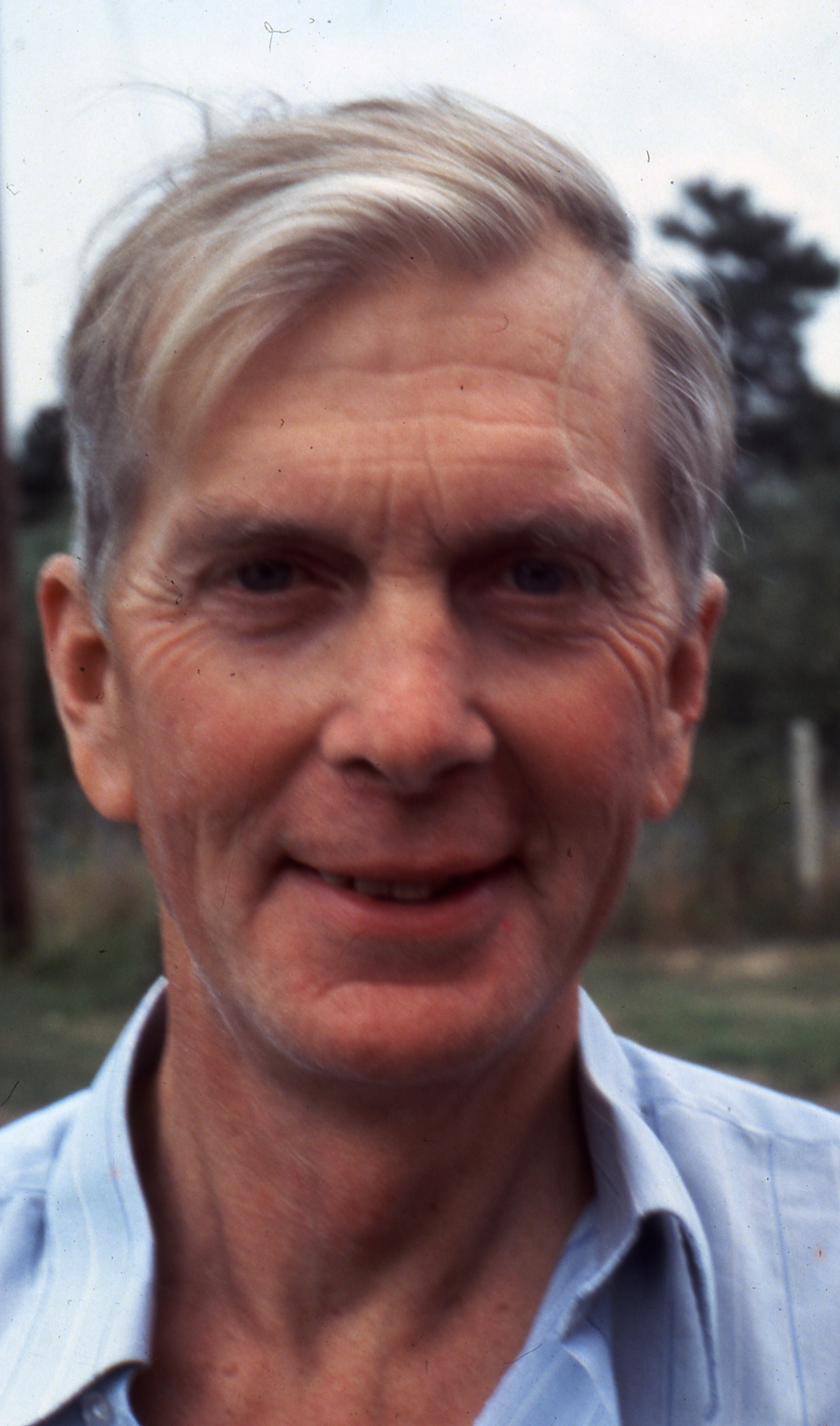
- Born: 27 September 1918; Brighton, England
- Died: 14 October 1984 (aged 66); Cambridge, England
- Education: Bradfield College; Christ Church, Oxford (BA, DPhil)
- Known for: Aperture synthesis Radio astronomy
- Spouse: Rowena Palmer (m. 1947)
- Awards: Hughes Medal (1954); RAS Gold Medal (1964); Henry Draper Medal (1965); Knight Bachelor (1966); Faraday Medal (1971); Royal Medal (1973); Bruce Medal (1974); Nobel Prize in Physics (1974)
- Scientific career
- Fields: Astronomy
- Workplaces: University of Cambridge; Gresham College
- Doctoral advisor: J. A. Ratcliffe
- Doctoral students: Malcolm Longair; Peter Rentzepis; Jan Högbom; John E. Baldwin

12th Astronomer Royal
- In office 1972–1982
- Preceded by: Richard van der Riet Woolley
- Succeeded by: Francis Graham Smith

Sir Martin Ryle (27 September 1918 – 14 October 1984) was an English radio astronomer who developed revolutionary radio telescope systems (see e.g. aperture synthesis) and used them for accurate location and imaging of weak radio sources. In 1946 Ryle and Derek Vonberg were the first people to publish interferometric astronomical measurements at radio wavelengths. With improved equipment, Ryle observed the most distant known galaxies in the universe at that time. He was the first Professor of Radio Astronomy in the University of Cambridge and founding director of the Mullard Radio Astronomy Observatory. He was the twelfth Astronomer Royal from 1972 to 1982. Ryle and Antony Hewish shared the Nobel Prize for Physics in 1974, the first Nobel prize awarded in recognition of astronomical research. In the 1970s, Ryle turned the greater part of his attention from astronomy to social and political issues which he considered to be more urgent. He was also an enthusiastic amateur radio operator (callsign G3CY).

== Education and early life ==
Martin Ryle was born in Brighton, England, the son of Professor John Alfred Ryle and Miriam (née Scully) Ryle. He was the nephew of Oxford University Professor of Philosophy Gilbert Ryle. Martin had four siblings, and at first was educated at home by a governess. After studying at Bradfield College, Ryle studied physics at Christ Church, Oxford. In 1939, Ryle worked with the Telecommunications Research Establishment (TRE) on the design of antennas for airborne radar equipment during World War II. After the war, he received a fellowship at the Cavendish Laboratory.

== Career and research ==
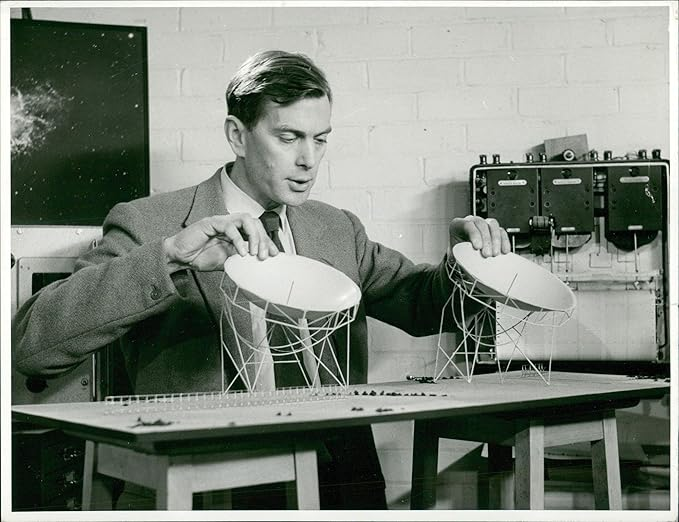
Martin Ryle with a telescope model

The focus of Ryle's early work in Cambridge was on radio waves from the Sun. His interest quickly shifted to other areas, however, and he decided early on that the Cambridge group should develop new observing techniques. As a result, Ryle was the driving force in the creation and improvement of astronomical interferometry and aperture synthesis, which paved the way for massive upgrades in the quality of radio astronomical data. In 1946 Ryle built the first multi-element astronomical radio interferometer.

Ryle guided the Cambridge radio astronomy group in the production of several important radio source catalogues. One such catalogue, the Third Cambridge Catalogue of Radio Sources (3C) in 1959 helped lead to the discovery of the first quasi-stellar object (quasar).

While serving as university lecturer in physics at Cambridge from 1948 to 1959, Ryle became director of the Mullard Radio Astronomy Observatory in 1957 and professor of radio astronomy in 1959. He was elected a Fellow of the Royal Society (FRS) in 1952, was knighted in 1966 (p 519 of) and succeeded Sir Richard Woolley as Astronomer Royal from 1972 to 1982. Ryle and Antony Hewish shared the Nobel Prize for Physics in 1974, the first Nobel prize awarded in recognition of astronomical research. In 1968 Ryle served as professor of astronomy at Gresham College, London.

=== Personality ===
According to numerous reports Ryle was quick-thinking, impatient with those slower than himself and charismatic. He was also idealistic, a characteristic he shared with his father. In an interview in 1982 he said "At times one feels that one should almost have a car sticker saying 'Stop Science Now' because we're getting cleverer and cleverer, but we do not increase the wisdom to go with it."

He was also intense and volatile, the latter characteristic being associated with his mother. The historian Owen Chadwick described him as "a rare personality, of exceptional sensitivity of mind, fears and anxieties, care and compassion, humour and anger."

Ryle was sometimes considered difficult to work with – he often worked in an office at the Mullard Radio Astronomy Observatory to avoid disturbances from other members of the Cavendish Laboratory and to avoid getting into heated arguments, as Ryle had a hot temper. Ryle worried that Cambridge would lose its standing in the radio astronomy community as other radio astronomy groups had much better funding, so he encouraged a certain amount of secrecy about his aperture synthesis methods in order to keep an advantage for the Cambridge group. Ryle had heated arguments with Fred Hoyle of the Institute of Astronomy about Hoyle's steady state universe, which restricted collaboration between the Cavendish Radio Astronomy Group and the Institute of Astronomy during the 1960s.

=== War, peace and energy ===
Ryle was a new physics graduate and an experienced amateur radio enthusiast in 1939, when the Second World War started. He played an important part in the Allied war effort, working mainly in radar countermeasures. After the war, "He returned to Cambridge with a determination to devote himself to pure science, unalloyed by the taint of war."

In the 1970s, Ryle turned the greater part of his attention from astronomy to social and political issues which he considered to be more urgent. With publications from 1976 and continuing, despite illness until he died in 1984, he pursued a passionate and intensive program on the socially responsible use of science and technology. His main themes were:

- Warning the world of the horrific dangers of nuclear armaments, notably in his pamphlet Towards the Nuclear Holocaust.
- Criticism of nuclear power, as in Is there a case for nuclear power?
- Research and promotion of alternative energy and energy efficiency, as in Short-term Storage and Wind Power Availability.
- Calling for the responsible use of science and technology. "...we should strive to see how the vast resources now diverted towards the destruction of life are turned instead to the solution of the problems which both rich - but especially the poor - countries of the world now face."

In 1983 Ryle responded to a request from the President of the Pontifical Academy of Sciences for suggestions of topics to be discussed at a meeting on Science and Peace. Ryle's reply was published posthumously in Martin Ryle's Letter. An abridged version appears in New Scientist with the title Martin Ryle's Last Testament. The letter ends with "Our cleverness has grown prodigiously – but not our wisdom."

=== Honours and awards ===
Ryle was awarded numerous prizes and honours including:

- Elected a Fellow of the Royal Society (FRS) in 1952
- Hughes Medal (1954)
- Gold Medal of the Royal Astronomical Society (1964)
- Fernand Holweck Medal and Prize (1965)
- Henry Draper Medal of the National Academy of Sciences (1965)
- Albert A. Michelson Medal of the Franklin Institute (1971)
- Royal Medal (1973)
- Bruce Medal (1974)
- Nobel Prize in Physics (1974)
- Ryle Telescope at Mullard Radio Astronomy Observatory
- In 1965 Ryle co-delivered the Royal Institution Christmas Lecture on Exploration of the Universe.

== Personal life ==
In their early years Ryle and his elder brother received lessons at home in carpentry and manual skills became important for him throughout his life. This was for relaxation – he built boats to his own design – and professionally. In his wartime radar work, his post-war radio-telescope building and his late researches into wind energy he was a hands-on practical engineer as well as a scientist.

Ryle had a lifelong interest in sailing and this matched his choice when in the 1970s he turned his research subject from astronomy to wind energy.

In his youth, Ryle became an amateur radio operator. While still at school (Bradfield College) he built his own transmitter and obtained a Post Office licence to operate it, with the callsign G3CY. As undergraduate he was a leading member of the Oxford University Wireless Society (callsign G3MM).

In 1936 the family moved to a house in Cambridge which became Ryle's home after the war. In 1947 he and Rowena Palmer married, and they lived in this house for the rest of his life. They had three children, born in 1949, 1951 and 1952. Ryle died on 14 October 1984, in Cambridge. He was celebrated on a first class stamp issued in 2009 as part of an Eminent Britons set. Lady Rowena Ryle died in 2013.
