= Fred Young (businessman) =

American businessman

- Education: Cornell University (BE) (MBA) (MEng)
- Occupation: Businessman
- Years active: 1968-1999
- Employer: Young Radiator Company

Fred Young is an American retired businessman. Young earned a bachelor's degree from Cornell University in 1964, and an MBA and master's degree in engineering from Cornell in 1966. After graduating from college, Young took a job with Cummins Engine Company, in Columbus, OH as a product manager. He joined Young Radiator, the company that was founded by his father in 1927, as the sales manager of the industrial and oil field division in 1968. In Aug. 1973, he was appointed to vice president - industrial marketing and assistant general manager, responsible for stock products and engineered equipment for staionary applications. On May 25, 1983, he was named president and CEO of Young Radiator. Young sold the company to MotivePower in 1999, after which he retired as CEO.

After retirement, he became a sponsor of academic research in astronomy, economics, and great ape conservation; a director of the Cato Institute and the Reason Foundation; and a member of the international Mont Pelerin Society. In 2020, the CCAT-p telescope, whose construction Fred Young had supported for over two decades and with over US$16 million, was renamed the Fred Young Submillimeter Telescope (FYST). In 2012, Young donated $100,000 to The Club for Growth Action, a conservative Super PAC. Young has supported other conservative groups and candidates, including Scott Walker. Young serves on the boards of the Cato Institute and the Reason Foundation. In 2013, Young filed a lawsuit challenging Wisconsin's campaign finance contribution limits.
