= Riccardo Giovanelli =

Astronomer (1946–2022)

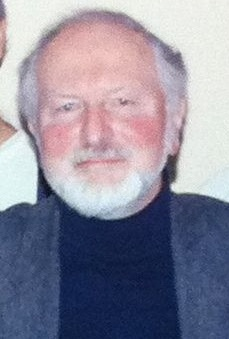
- Giovanelli in 2006
- Born: August 30, 1946; Praticello, Emilia-Romagna, Italy
- Died: December 14, 2022 (aged 76); Ithaca, New York, USA
- Education: University of Bologna, Indiana University Bloomington (PhD)
- Known for: Work mapping the universe with radio telescopes
- Awards: Henry Draper Medal (1989); Fulbright fellow
- Scientific career
- Fields: Astronomer
- Doctoral students: Amélie Saintonge

Riccardo Giovanelli (August 30, 1946 – December 14, 2022) was an Italian-born American astronomer. He was an emeritus professor of astronomy at Cornell University in Ithaca, New York, United States.

== Background ==
Born at Praticello, in northern Italy, Giovanelli spent his childhood years in western Argentina (in Mendoza and Tucuman) but returned with his family to Italy when he was ready to enter university. He studied physics first at the University of Parma and graduated with his laurea cum laude in physics from the University of Bologna in 1969. His parents were partisans during World War II.

After graduation, Giovanelli entered the graduate program at Indiana University Bloomington, in the United States, as a Fulbright fellow and received his PhD in astronomy in 1976. He undertook his PhD research as a graduate student in residence at the National Radio Astronomy Observatory in Charlottesville, Virginia in 1972 and 1973. From 1974 to 1976, he served as a civil volunteer teaching physics at the National University of El Salvador, in substitution of his Italian military service. Upon completion of his PhD, he joined the staff of the Arecibo Observatory of the National Astronomy and Ionosphere Center in Puerto Rico, eventually serving as head of the radio astronomy group as well as observatory site director.

In 1991, Giovanelli joined the faculty at Cornell University as professor of astronomy. He was an expert in observational cosmology, galaxy evolution and the application of radio spectroscopy for studies of large scale structure and galaxy evolution. He was a driving force behind the development of the Cerro Chajnantor Atacama Telescope project of which he served as the initial director. He was a principal scientist on the ALFALFA survey at Arecibo. He was also a strong proponent in support of science in developing countries in South America.

Giovanelli died on 14 December 2022 at his home in Ithaca, New York due to complications from Parkinson’s disease. He was married to fellow astronomer Martha Haynes, whom he met when they were both students at Indiana University Bloomington, until his death. The pair remained childless.

== Awards ==
In 1989 Giovanelli and Martha Haynes were awarded the Henry Draper Medal from the National Academy of Sciences for their work on mapping the local universe.
