= List of fellows of the Royal Society elected in 1952 =

This is a list of people elected Fellow of the Royal Society in 1952.

== Fellows ==
- Sir Wallace Alan Akers
- Cecil Edwin Henry Bawn
- Norman John Berrill
- Edward Ettingdean Bridges, Baron Bridges
- John Hubert Craigie
- Freeman John Dyson
- Dame Honor Bridget Fell
- Dalziel Llewellyn Hammick
- Leonard Hawkes
- William Owen James
- Harry Jones
- Sir Bernard Katz
- Max Rudolf Lemberg
- Sir William Hunter McCrea
- Joseph Stanley Mitchell
- Albert Cyril Offord
- Sir Alfred Grenville Pugsley
- Robert Russell Race
- Sir Martin Ryle
- David Macleish Smith
- Frank Stuart Spring
- Edward Wilfred Taylor
- Samuel Tolansky
- Marthe Louise Vogt
- Thomas Stanley Westoll
- Donald Devereux Woods

== Foreign members ==
- Sven Otto Horstadius
- Albert Jan Kluyver
- Albert Marcel Germain Rene Portevin
- Tadeus Reichstein
