= Fred Young Submillimeter Telescope =

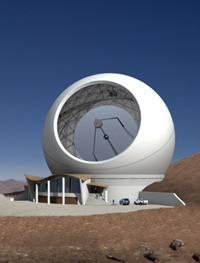
- Concept image of proposed Cerro Chajnantor Atacama Telescope (CCAT)
- Alternative names: Cerro Chajnantor Atacama Telescope
- Location: Purico Complex, El Loa, Antofagasta Region, Chile
- Coordinates: 22°59′09″S 67°44′25″W
- Altitude: 5,612 m (18,412 ft)
- First light: 2026
- Diameter: 6 m (19 ft 8 in)
- Website: www.ccatobservatory.org
- Location within Chile
- Related media on Commons

The Fred Young Submillimeter Telescope (FYST, pronounced "feast") is the CCAT Observatory's 6-meter aperture modified Crossed Dragone telescope located on Cerro Chajnator in the Chilean Atacama Desert at an elevation of 5600m. The Simons Observatory Large Aperture Telescope features a nearly-identical optical design. FYST utilizes submillimeter broadband cameras and spectrometers featuring superconducting detector arrays that will aid in its mission to reveal new details about the cosmic origins of the Universe. Prior plans for the telescope were called the Cornell Caltech Atacama Telescope. On September 14, 2020, the telescope was renamed to be the Fred Young Submillimeter Telescope (FYST) after Fred Young, a Cornell alumnus who has supported the telescope for about two decades with over US$16 million. FYST was officially inaugurated on April 9, 2026.

== Site ==
The telescope site is at an altitude of 5,612 metres (18,412 ft), on Cerro Chajnantor in the volcanic Purico Complex, in the Atacama Desert of northern Chile. FYST will be one of the highest permanent, ground-based telescopes in the world. The University of Tokyo Atacama Observatory is located slightly above the proposed telescope location on the same peak.

== Description ==
The CCAT consortium participating in the project includes Cornell University, University of Cologne, University of Bonn, University of Waterloo, University of British Columbia, and other institutions in Germany and Canada.

The FYST telescope will complement other cutting-edge observatories such as the nearby Atacama Large Millimeter Array (ALMA), by discovering new sources that ALMA will follow up with highly detailed imagery. FYST's unique extreme high-altitude site also enables new measurements in submillimeter atmospheric windows not typically accessible with ground-based telescopes. As a result, FYST is expected to complement the Simons Observatory in its search for traces of the Big Bang in the Cosmic Microwave Background by helping to mitigate obscuring foreground sources in measurements.

The FYST telescope will be outfitted with a wide-field camera called Prime-Cam that is expected to map the sky many times faster than previous submillimeter instruments, including SCUBA-2 camera installed on the James Clerk Maxwell Telescope in Hawaii.

The submillimeter- and millimeter-wavelength light that FYST will measure is a type of microwave radiation that is closest to infrared in the light spectrum. These measurements will enable astronomers to learn more about the Milky Way, local galaxies, the epoch of reionization, and cosmology.

== Construction ==
In January 2014, the Chilean government granted the use of land on Cerro Chajnantor to the CCAT consortium for the telescope and the road to the mountain summit. Also in January 2014, the Atacama Astronomy Park was inaugurated by the Chilean government, to coordinate activities between the current and upcoming observatories in the Chajnantor region.

The 6-metre CCAT-prime telescope construction started 2017 (signing of construction contract), with first light expected in 2026. The fabrication of telescope components started late 2018.

The disassembled telescope having been trucked nearly 300 miles to the base of Cerro Chajnantor, it will be reassembled at the summit (first light projected for April 2026).

== See also ==
- Lists of telescopes
- Martha P. Haynes, project director, originally proposed with Riccardo Giovanelli in the mid-1990s that a CCAT-like telescope be built
- Riccardo Giovanelli, originally proposed with Martha Haynes in the mid-1990s that a CCAT-like telescope be built
