= Collège Notre-Dame du Sacré-Cœur =

Collège Notre-Dame

Location
- 3791, chemin Queen Mary; Montreal, Quebec, H3V 1A8; Canada; 45.494°N 73.622°W

Information
- School type: Private
- Religious affiliation: Roman Catholic
- Established: 1869
- Grades: 7–11
- Enrollment: 1738
- Language: French
- Founded by: Congregation of Holy Cross
- Director: Jean-Philippe Perron (2022)
- Website: www.collegenotredame.com

Collège Notre-Dame du Sacré-Cœur is a subsidized, private French language co-education secondary school in Montreal, Quebec, Canada. Collège Notre-Dame du Sacré-Cœur shares its name with the University of Notre Dame, which was also founded by the Congregation of Holy Cross. Notre-Dame means "Our Lady" in French and refers to the Blessed Virgin Mary. Sacré-Cœur means "Sacred Heart", which refers to the physical heart of Jesus Christ as a symbol of Divine love. It is generally considered one of the best French-language secondary schools in the city. School fees for the 2020-2021 school year were $4,591. They are able to maintain low tuition due to the large average class size of 34 as well as subsidies from the Quebec government of roughly $4,500 per student. The school is right in front of Saint Joseph's Oratory. In fact, Saint André Bessette, who built the Oratory, was the school's doorkeeper.

== History ==
- 1869: Purchase of the Hôtel Bellevue and foundation of the College.
- 1881: Construction of the wing 1881.
- 1888: Construction of the chapel.
- 1929: Construction of the wing 1929.
- 1951: Construction of the 4th floor of wing B.
- 1955: Construction of the Notre Dame Center.
- 1962: Construction of the Lefebvre Pavilion.
- 1974: Construction of the arena.
- 2008: Development of the Jacques-Gauthier Stadium and the Guillaume-Descormiers athletics track.
- 2015: Development of the Reine Marie synthetic pitch.
- 2020: Beginning of the construction of the future gymnasium.

The school was founded in 1869 by the Congregation of Holy Cross and was administered by Roman Catholic priests and brothers. Originally a boys-only school, it decided to allow female students in 1982 in grades 7 and 8 and then progressively became completely co-educational.

In recent years, the institution has come into the public eye for a multitude of sex abuse cases and cover-ups spanning the better part of the second half of the 20th century.

== Sports ==
The football team, the Cactus, was created in 1958 and is playing in Quebec's AAA league. It has won fifteen provincial championships (87, 88, 89, 90, 94, 96, 01, 02, 05, 09, 10, 11, 13, 15, 21) and is largely regarded among football analysts to be one of the great dynasties in Canadian Football. The Cactus now offer several sports:

- Athletics
- Football
- Futsal
- Badminton
- Ultimate Frisbee
- Basketball
- Ice hockey
- Volleyball
- Swimming
- Cheerleading
- Flag football

== Extracurricular Activities ==
- Art
- Chess club
- Cooking courses
- Génie en herbe
- Robotics
- Theatre classes
- Improvisation classes
- Music classes

== Facilities ==
The school library has over 20,000 books of all genres. It has three student-played orchestras. The computer labs have over a hundred computers. Teachers have recourse to technology whilst teaching: every classroom is equipped with a projector, a touchscreen board as well as a computer. An indoor hockey arena, which seats around 400 spectators, is located behind the school. Collège Notre-Dame possesses a grandiose auditorium. In addition, this institute has an indoor swimming pool, a football field, a soccer field, two fitness rooms, a race track and an indoor basketball court. The school is currently extending its building. In fact, in 2020, Collège Notre-Dame began building its very own sportive complex, at the costs of twenty million dollars. The school is composed of three buildings, the “Old Building”, the “C Building” and the “P Building”. All three buildings are five stories high. The C Building has two huge study halls, which are both equipped with desks. The rooms are used by the students during their study periods.

== Music ==
Music classes are mandatory in grade 7 and grade 8. The class lasts 5 months, which equals to a semester and is then replaced by ERC (religious class) for the second semester of the same school year. Students can choose from wind instruments, percussion or double bass. Students playing the bassoon, oboe or double bass will benefit from one private lesson per week with a specialist, since those instruments are particularly difficult for beginners. Depending on their performance, they can participate in a music concert at the end of the semester.

Every year, the different orchestras participate at the Festival des Harmonies et des Orchestre Symphoniques du Quebec held in Sherbrooke. There, the OAV (Orchestre à Vent, which stands for wind orchestra in French, and is the highest level ensemble of the school) plays different pieces (usually one warm-up piece and two competition pieces) and they are graded according to the orchestra's level.

Musicians can also participate in the Concours Solistes et Petits Ensembles from the FHOSQ (Fédération des Harmonies et des Orchestres Symphoniques du Québec) in Victoriaville. If they achieve a greater distinction mark, they win a prize, usually a certain amount of money for a specific music summer camp.

== Improv ==
Collège Notre-Dame has an improvisation team in the ligue d'improvisation scolaire. It has won the Calembour cup twice. The school is represented in the "Cadet" category by the CoiNciDence, which has won the regional championship in 2013 and the "Juvenile" category by the inCaNDescence.

== Notable alumni ==
- François Arnaud, actor The Borgias
- Mathieu Brodeur, hockey player
- Grégory Charles, singer
- J. P. Darche, NFL football player
- Mathieu Darche, NHL hockey player
- L. P. Ladouceur, NFL football player
- Jean-Luc Mongrain
- Éric Perrin, hockey player
- Émile Proulx-Cloutier, actor
- Serge Robert, (Mononc' Serge)
- Martin St. Louis, NHL hockey player
- Amélie Saintonge, astrophysicist
- Alexandre Tagliani, racecar driver
- Mathieu Betts, CFL football player
