= Henry Draper Medal =

American astrophysics award

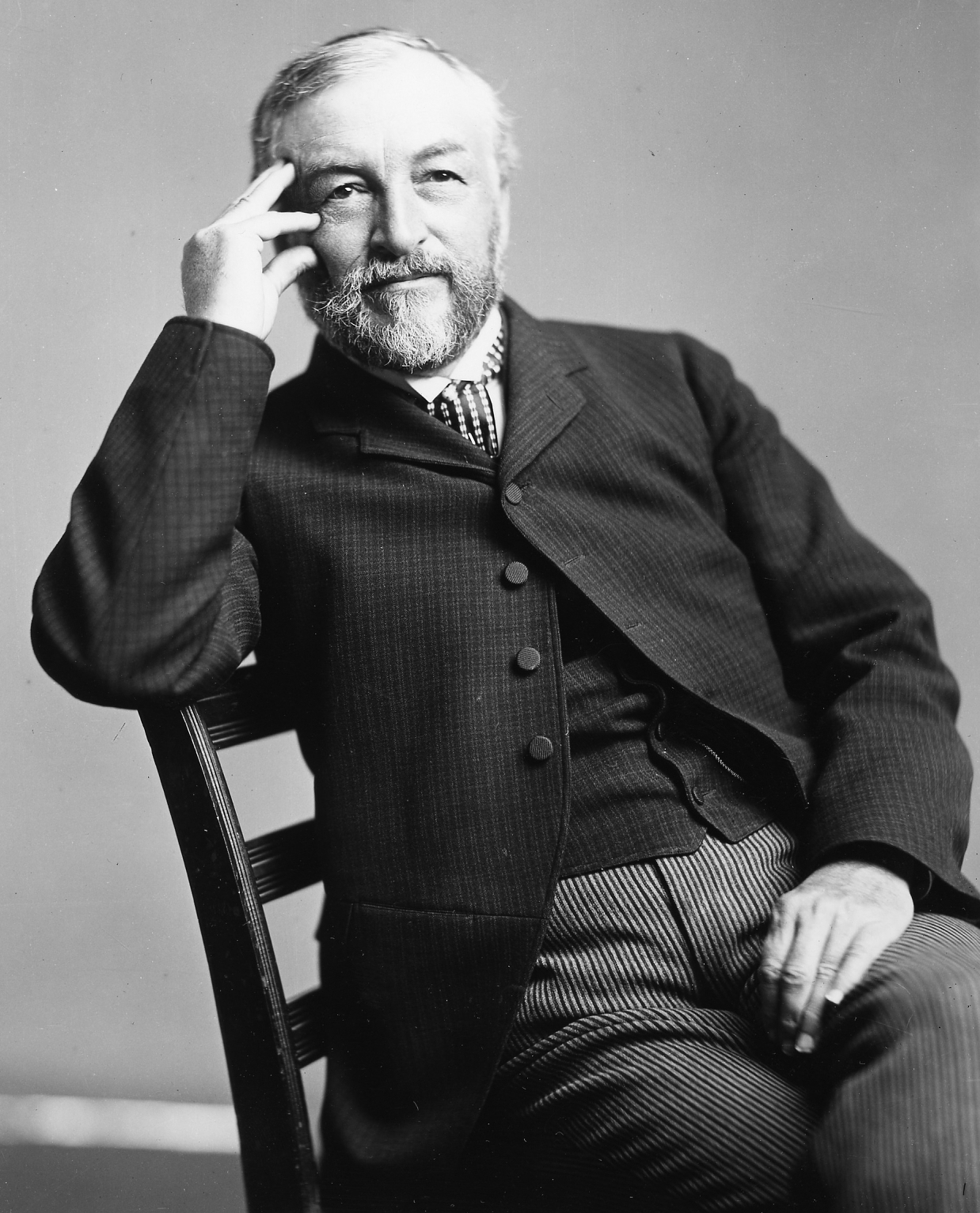
Samuel Pierpont Langley, who was the first recipient of the medal in 1886 "for numerous investigations of a high order of merit in solar physics, and especially in the domain of radiant energy"

The Henry Draper Medal is awarded every 4 years by the United States National Academy of Sciences "for investigations in astronomical physics". Named after Henry Draper, the medal is awarded with a gift of US$15,000. The medal was established under the Draper Fund by his widow, Anna Draper, in honor of her husband, and was first awarded in 1886 to Samuel Pierpont Langley "for numerous investigations of a high order of merit in solar physics, and especially in the domain of radiant energy". It has since been awarded 45 times.

The medal has been awarded to multiple individuals in the same year: in 1977 it was awarded to Arno Allan Penzias and Robert Woodrow Wilson "for their discovery of the cosmic microwave radiation (a remnant of the very early universe), and their leading role in the discovery of interstellar molecules"; in 1989 to Riccardo Giovanelli and Martha P. Haynes "for the first three-dimensional view of some of the remarkable large-scale filamentary structures of our visible universe"; in 1993 to Ralph Asher Alpher and Robert Herman "for their insight and skill in developing a physical model of the evolution of the universe and in predicting the existence of a microwave background radiation years before this radiation was serendipitously discovered" and in 2001 to R. Paul Butler and Geoffrey Marcy "for their pioneering investigations of planets orbiting other stars via high-precision radial velocities".

== List of recipients ==
Source: National Academy of Sciences

Year	Name	Rationale	Ref
1886	Samuel Pierpont Langley	"For numerous investigations of a high order of merit in solar physics, and especially in the domain of radiant energy"	
1888	Edward Charles Pickering	"For his work in stellar photometry, stellar photography, and stellar spectrum photography"	
1890	Henry Augustus Rowland	"For his researches on the solar spectrum, as well as for his investigations in astronomical physics"	
1893	Hermann Carl Vogel	"For spectroscopic observations upon the motion of stars in the line of sight, and other kindred researches"	
1899	James Edward Keeler	"For his researches in spectroscopic astronomy"	
1901	William Huggins	"For his investigations in astronomical physics"	
1904	George Ellery Hale	"For investigations of solar phenomena, studies of stellar spectra, editing the Astrophysical Journal, and the direction of the Yerkes Observatory"	
1906	William Wallace Campbell	"For his observations and researches relating to the motions of stars in the line of sight, his improvements in the methods of measuring such motions, his discussions of conclusions to be drawn from them, and the organization of work in this field in the southern hemisphere"	
1910	Charles Greeley Abbot	"For his researches on the infra-red region of the solar spectrum and his accurate measurements, by improved devices, of the solar 'constant' of radiation"	
1913	Henri-Alexandre Deslandres	"For his researches in solar and stellar physics"	
1915	Joel Stebbins	"In recognition of his work on application of the selenium cell to stellar photometry"	
1916	Albert Abraham Michelson	"For his numerous and important contributions to spectroscopy and astronomical physics"	
1918	Walter Sydney Adams	"For discovering and developing a method of determining the distances of the stars by means of a spectrograph"	
1919	Charles Fabry	"In recognition of his researches in physics and astronomy, chiefly by means of interferometers"	
1920	Alfred Fowler	"For his researches in celestial and laboratory spectroscopy, which have led to a valuable increase of our knowledge of sun spots, comets, and the stars—especially of red stars of Secchi's Type III"	
1921	Pieter Zeeman	"For his discovery of the so-called Zeeman effect and for its application on magneto-optics"	
1922	Henry Norris Russell	"For his remarkably valuable contributions to knowledge of the order of stellar evolution"	
1924	Arthur Stanley Eddington	"For his contribution to knowledge of physical conditions existing within the stars, and for his constructive interpretation of the Einstein theory of the relativity as applied to astronomical problems"	
1926	Harlow Shapley	"For his contributions to astronomical science"	
1928	William Hammond Wright	"For his researches on nebulae, new stars, and planetary atmospheres"	
1931	Annie Jump Cannon	"In recognition of her astronomical work, in particular for cataloging the spectra of stars"	
1932	Vesto Slipher	"For his spectroscopic researches"	
1934	John Stanley Plaskett	"For his able and consistent labors in stellar radial velocities, and related studies energetically pursued for nearly 30 years"	
1936	Kenneth Mees	"For his fruitful investigations in photographic process which have given emulsions sensitive to red and infrared of the spectrum and made possible great advance in knowledge of this highly important region of the radiant energy of stars"	
1940	Robert W. Wood	"In recognition of his contributions to astronomical physics; more especially his researches on the spectra and chemical composition of gaseous nebulae"	
1942	Ira Sprague Bowen	"In recognition of his contributions to astronomical physics; more especially his pioneer work upon resonance spectra, his use of color filters in astronomical photography, and his development of methods for concentrating to a high degree the light from diffraction gratings in desired orders and regions of the spectrum"	
1946	Paul W. Merrill	"In recognition of his many important contributions to astronomical physics, in particular those relating to his researches in stellar spectroscopy"	
1948	Hans Bethe	"In recognition of his contributions to astronomical physics, more particularly his researches on the generation of energy in the sun and stars"	
1949	Otto Struve	"For his contributions to astronomical physics"	
1951	Bernard Lyot	"For his contributions to solar physics. The coronograph, invented by Lyot, has made possible continuous observation of the inner corona on all clear days at any suitable location"	
1955	Hendrik C. van de Hulst	"For his pioneer work on the 21 cm radiation of neutral hydrogen"	
1957	Horace W. Babcock	"For his original and outstanding work leading to the discovery of magnetic fields in stars and also the general magnetic field of the sun"	
1961	Martin Schwarzschild	"For his book Structure and Evolution of the Stars and two papers, "On the Maximum Mass of Stable Stars" and "Evolution of very Massive Stars," which are outstanding contributions in the field of stellar evolution"	
1963	Richard Tousey	"For his achievements in solar spectroscopy"	
1965	Martin Ryle	"For the development of a novel radio-telescopic equipment which made it possible to determine accurately positions of the numerous weak radio sources in the sky"	
1968	Bengt Edlén	"In recognition of his fruitful researches in astronomical physics, and particularly for his part in the discovery and proof of extremely high temperatures in the sun's corona"	
1971	Subrahmanyan Chandrasekhar	"For his leadership in, and major contributions to, the field of astrophysics"	
1974	Lyman Spitzer	"For his vision and distinguished achievements in space astronomy and for his many outstanding contributions to the physics of the plasmas on earth and in the interstellar medium"	
1977	Arno Allan Penzias and Robert Woodrow Wilson	"For their discovery of the cosmic microwave radiation (a remnant of the very early universe), and their leading role in the discovery of interstellar molecules"	
1980	William Wilson Morgan	"For his pioneering researches in spectral classification, leading to a new standard of accuracy in our knowledge of the distances of the stars and the structure of our galaxy"	
1985	Joseph Taylor	"For his pioneering studies of pulsars, including the fundamental measurements of orbit perturbations by gravitational radiation and other general relativistic effects"	
1989	Riccardo Giovanelli and Martha P. Haynes	"For the first three-dimensional view of some of the remarkable large-scale filamentary structures of our visible universe"	
1993	Ralph Asher Alpher and Robert Herman	"For their insight and skill in developing a physical model of the evolution of the universe and in predicting the existence of a microwave background radiation years before this radiation was serendipitously discovered; through this work they were participants in one of the major intellectual achievements of the twentieth century"	
1997	Bohdan Paczyński	"For his epochal contributions toward understanding gamma-ray bursts, the evolution of binary stars, and especially the gravitational lensing and microlensing of light from distant objects"	
2001	R. Paul Butler and Geoffrey Marcy	"For their pioneering investigations of planets orbiting other stars via high-precision radial velocities. They have proved that many other planetary systems exist in the universe"	
2005	Charles L. Bennett	"For his contribution to the precise determination of the age, composition, and curvature of the universe through his leadership of NASA's WMAP [Wilkinson Microwave Anisotropy Probe] cosmic microwave background mission"	
2009	Neil Gehrels	"For his pioneering contributions to gamma ray astronomy. His leadership of the Compton Gamma Ray Observatory and the Swift Mission has led to new insights into the extreme physics of active galactic nuclei and gamma ray bursts"	
2013	William J. Borucki	"For his founding concept, unflagging advocacy, and visionary leadership during the development of NASA's Kepler mission, which has uncovered myriad planets and solar systems with unforeseen and surprising properties."	
2017	Barry C. Barish and Stanley E. Whitcomb	"Honoring Barish and Whitcomb, on behalf of the LIGO collaboration, for their visionary and pivotal leadership roles, scientific guidance, and novel instrument design during the development of LIGO that were crucial for LIGO's discovery of gravitational waves from colliding black holes, thus directly validating Einstein's 100-year-old prediction of gravitational waves and ushering a new field of gravitational wave astronomy."	
2021	Sheperd S. Doeleman and Heino Falcke	"for their vision and their leadership within the EHT collaboration, embracing theory, instrumentation, observation and analysis in combining radio telescopes around the world to image the shadow of the supermassive black hole in the nearby galaxy M87, thereby validating Einstein’s general theory of relativity."	
2025	Adam K. Leroy	"for his pathbreaking efforts to advance understanding of the interstellar medium."	

== See also ==
- List of astronomy awards
- List of physics awards
