= Martha P. Haynes =

American astronomer (born 1951)

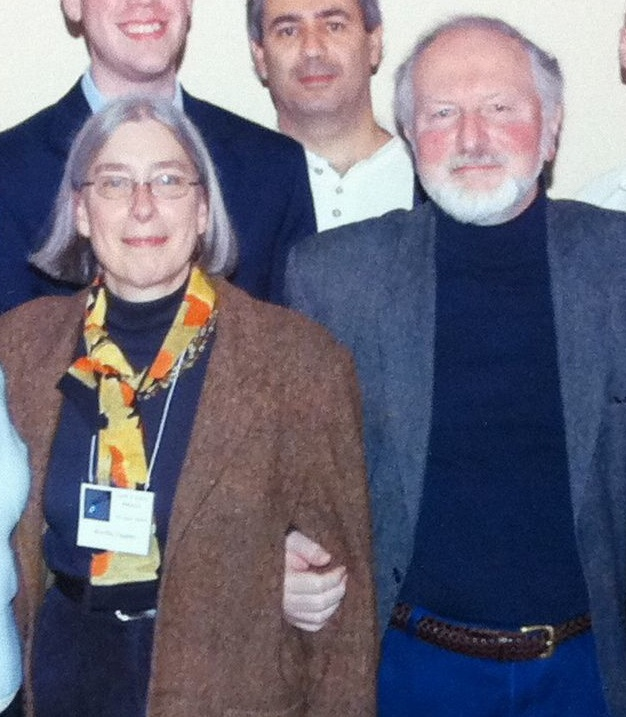
- Haynes with Riccardo Giovanelli
- Born: Martha Patricia Haynes; April 24, 1951 (age 75); Boston, Massachusetts, USA
- Education: Wellesley (BSc), Indiana (PhD)
- Known for: Work mapping the universe with radio telescopes
- Awards: Henry Draper Medal (1989); Catherine Wolfe Bruce Gold Medal (2019)
- Scientific career
- Fields: Astrophysics
- Doctoral advisor: Morton Roberts

Martha Patricia Haynes (born 24 April 1951) is an American astronomer who specializes in radio astronomy and extragalactic astronomy. She is the distinguished professor of arts and sciences in astronomy at Cornell University. She has been on a number of high-level committees within the US and International Astronomical Community, including advisory committee for the Division of Engineering and Physical Sciences of the National Academies (2003–2008) and Astronomy and Astrophysics Decadal Review (in 2010). She was a vice-president of the executive committee of the International Astronomical Union from 2006–2012, and was on the board of trustees of Associated Universities Inc from 1994 until 2016, serving two terms as board chair and one year as interim president. In 2026, she was elected to the American Philosophical Society.

== Academic career ==
Haynes graduated from Wellesley College in 1973 with a B.A. in physics and astronomy. She went to Indiana University Bloomington for graduate school. There she received her M.A. in 1975 and her Ph.D. in 1978. From 1978 until 1981 she worked at the National Astronomy and Ionosphere Center when she left to become the assistant director for the Green Bank Telescope. She joined the faculty at Cornell in 1983. There she worked with collaborator Riccardo Giovanelli, using radio telescopes to map the distribution of galaxies in the Universe.

She was co-lead of the ALFALFA survey, having worked with the project (and its predecessor project, the ALFA survey) since the early 2000s.

Together with Riccardo Giovanelli, she worked on the development of the Cerro Chajnantor Atacama Telescope (CCAT) in the mid-1990s, which has led to the construction of the Fred Young Submillimeter Telescope (FYST) on Cerro Chajnantor in northern Chile. She is (as of 2020) the chairman of the board of directors for the CCAT-project.

== Honors and awards ==
- In 1989, Haynes received together with her collaborator Riccardo Giovanelli the Henry Draper Medal "for the first three-dimensional view of some of the remarkable large-scale filamentary structures of our visible universe".
- In 1999 she was elected to American Academy of Arts and Sciences and in 2000 was elected to the National Academy of Sciences.
- She was awarded the Catherine Wolfe Bruce Gold Medal of the Astronomical Society of the Pacific in 2019 "in recognition of a lifetime of outstanding achievement and contributions to astrophysics research".
- Asteroid 26744 Marthahaynes, discovered by astronomers of LONEOS program at Anderson Mesa Station in 2001, was named in her honor. The official naming citation was published by the Minor Planet Center on November 8, 2019 (M.P.C. 118219).
- She was awarded the 2020 Karl G. Jansky Lectureship.
- She was elected a Legacy Fellow of the American Astronomical Society in 2020.

== Personal life ==
Haynes is married to longtime collaborator Riccardo Giovanelli. They live in Ithaca, New York.

== Selected publications ==
- Haynes, M. P., and R. Giovanelli. "Large-Scale Structure in the Local Universe: The Pisces-Perseus Supercluster." In Large-Scale Motions in the Universe, V. C. Rubin and G. F. Coyne, eds. (Princeton: Princeton University Press, 1988), 45.
- Haynes, M. P. "Evidence for Gas Deficiency in Cluster Galaxies." In Clusters of Galaxies, W. R. Oegerle, M. J. Fitchett, and L. Danly, eds. (New York: Cambridge University Press, 1990), 177.
- Vogt, N. P., T. Herter, M. P. Haynes, and S. Courteau. "The Rotation Curves of Galaxies at Intermediate Redshift." Astrophys. J. Lett. 415 (1993).
- Roberts, M. S., and M. P. Haynes. "Variation of Physical Properties along the Hubble Sequence." Annu. Rev. Astron. Astrophys. 32, 115 (1994).
- Haynes, M. P., and A. H. Broeils. "Cool HI Disks in Galaxies." In Gas Disks in Galaxies, J. M. van der Hulst, ed. (New York: Springer-Verlag, 1995), to appear.

== See also ==
- ALFALFA, an astronomical survey at the Arecibo Observatory
