= NGC 959 =

Spiral galaxy in the northern constellation of Triangulum

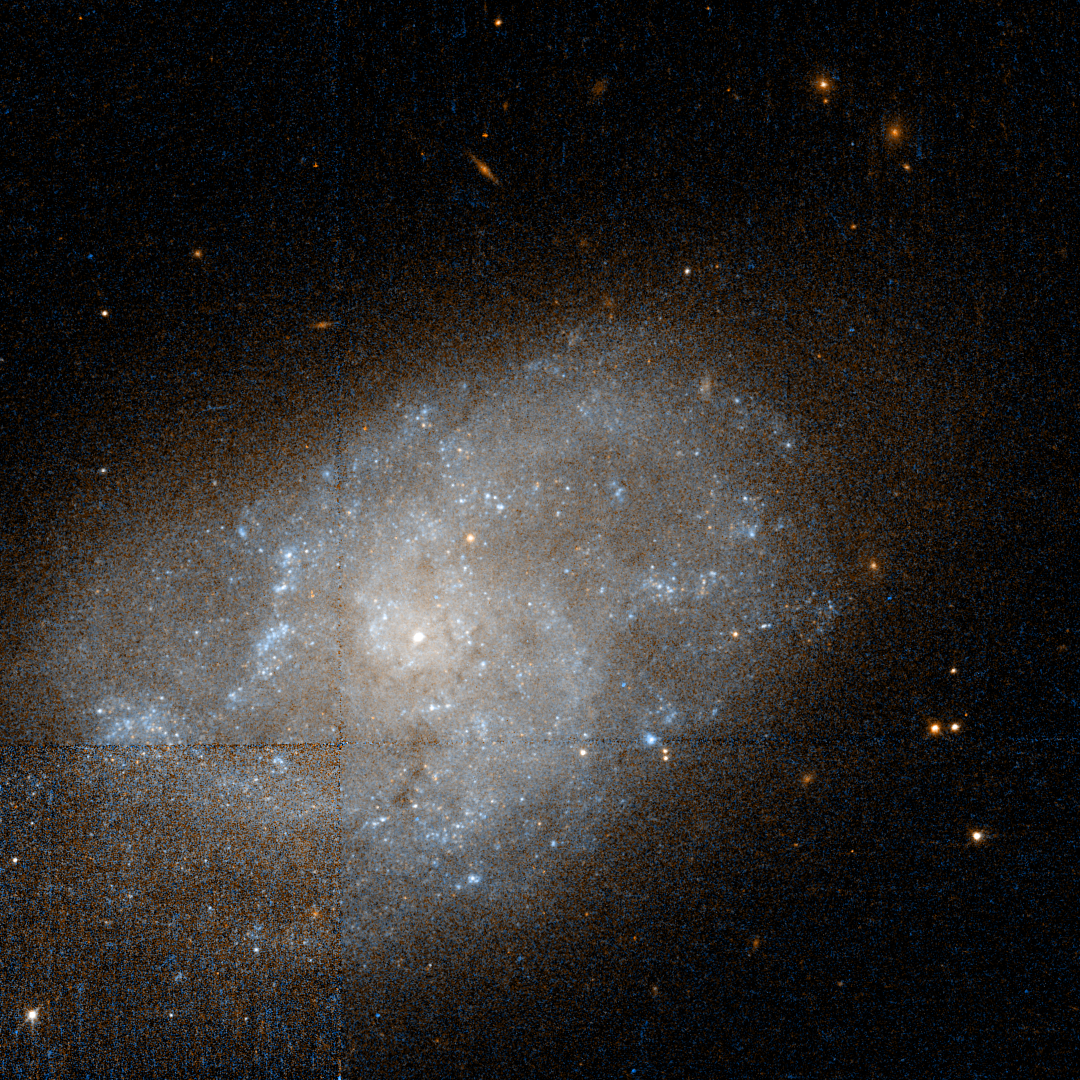
- NGC 959 imaged by the Hubble Space Telescope

Observation data (J2000 epoch)
- Constellation: Triangulum
- Right ascension: 02^{h} 32^{m} 23.923^{s}
- Declination: +35° 29′ 40.46″
- Heliocentric radial velocity: 596 km/s
- Distance: 36 Mly (11.0 Mpc)
- Group or cluster: NGC 1023 Group
- Apparent magnitude (V): 12.38±0.14
- Apparent magnitude (B): 12.95±0.14

Characteristics
- Type: Sdm: or SBcd
- Mass: 6.3×10^{8} (stellar) M_{☉}
- Size: 21.8 kly (6.69 kpc)
- Apparent size (V): 2′.3 × 1′.4 (D_{25})

Other designations
- IRAS 02293+3516, NGC 959, UGC 2002, LEDA 9665, MCG +06-06-051, PGC 9665

NGC 959 is a spiral galaxy in the northern constellation of Triangulum. It was discovered on 9 November 1876 by French astronomer Édouard Stephan. This galaxy is located at a distance of 36 million light years and is receding with a heliocentric radial velocity of 596 km/s. It is a member of the NGC 1023 Group of galaxies.

The morphological class of this galaxy is Sdm:, indicating it is a spiral (S) with disorganized, irregular arms and no central bulge (dm). The ':' suffix indicates some uncertainty about the classification. It has a visual magnitude of 12.4. The galactic plane is inclined at an angle of 50° to the plane of the sky, giving it an elliptical profile with the major axis aligned along a position angle of 65°. The size of the D_{25} ellipse (where the brightness of the galaxy drops to magnitude 25) is 2.3 × 1.4 arcminutes.

When images of NGC 959 are corrected for the effects of extinction from dust, a central bar feature can be discerned. The galaxy then shows a non-negligible bulge or central condensation, and may instead have a morphological type of SBcd. It displays a cuspy central density profile and bulge-like monotonic decrease in ellipticity toward the core.
