= SN 1961V =

1961 supernova-like event in NGC 1058

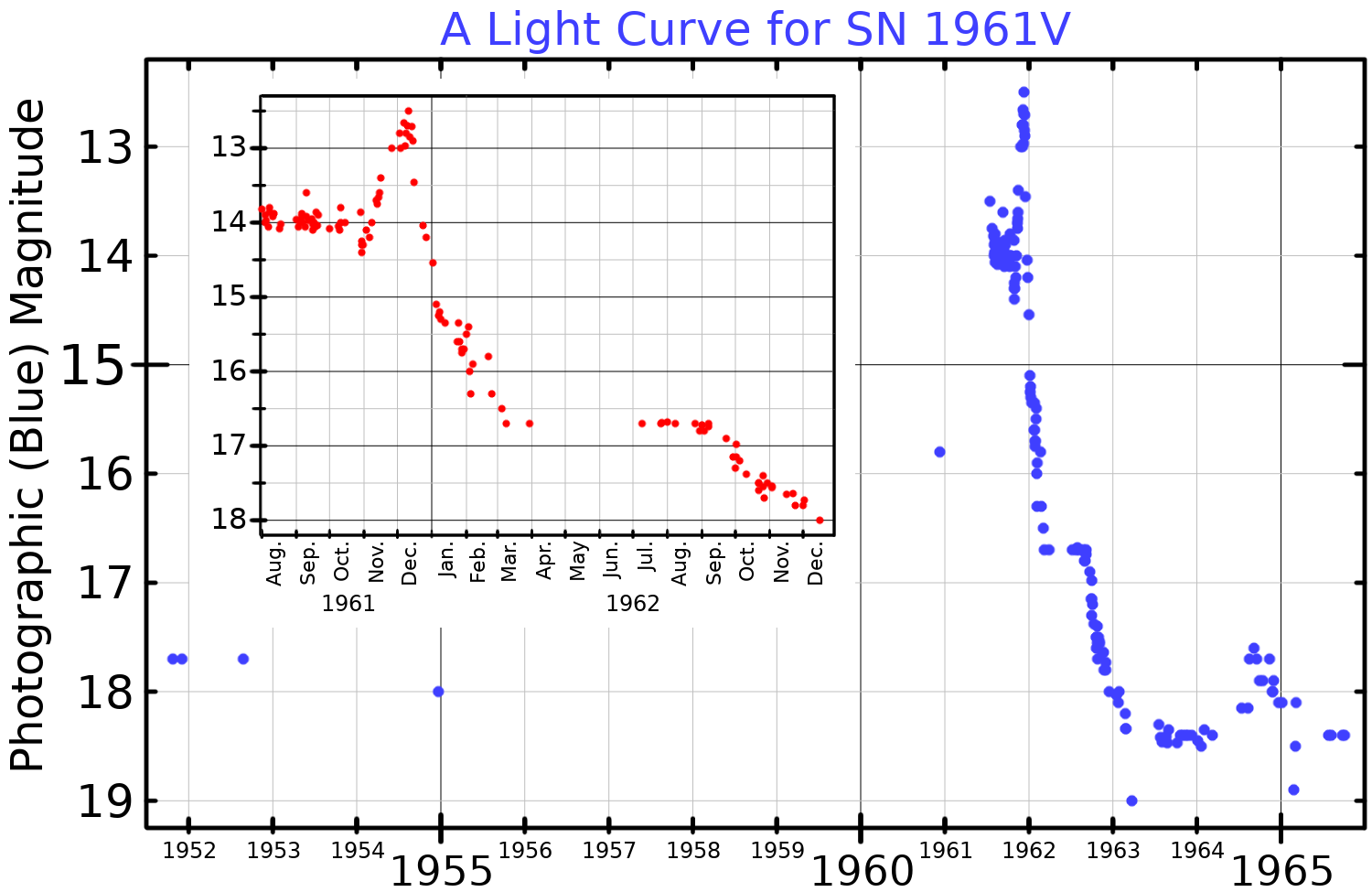
- A blue-light light curve for SN 1961V. The inset plot shows the time around maximum brightness with an expanded horizontal scale. Plotted from data published by Woosley & Smith (2022)
- Event type: Supernova
- possibly Type II (potential impostor)
- Date: 11 July 1961
- Constellation: Perseus
- Right ascension: 02^{h} 43^{m} 36.42^{s}
- Declination: +37° 20′ 43.6″
- Epoch: J2000
- Distance: 9,300,000 pc (30,000,000 ly)
- Remnant: unknown
- Host: NGC 1058
- Progenitor type: LBV
- Notable features: potential supernova impostor
- Peak apparent magnitude: +12.5
- Other designations: SN 1961V

SN 1961V was an abnormal, supernova-like event that was a potential supernova impostor. It was discovered by Paul Wild on 11 July 1961. The potential impostor nature of SN 1961V was first identified by Fritz Zwicky in 1964. SN 1961V occurred in galaxy NGC 1058, about 9.3 Mpc away (about 30 million light years). Unlike many supernovae, the progenitor star is tentatively known: an extremely large, very bright blue star, similar to Eta Carinae. Mass estimates of the precursor star were as high as 2000 times the mass of the sun, but these are likely to be extreme overestimates. If SN 1961V was not a supernova then it was most likely an extremely large outburst by a luminous blue variable star.

The remnant of SN 1961V's explosion is expanding at 2,000 km/s, which is much slower than the majority of supernovae. The profile of its light curve, with a gradual climb to maximum brightness, was unusual when compared to a supernova. This unusual light curve led to suspicion that it was some other event. If the star survived this would identify SN 1961V as an impostor supernova rather than a true supernova. Attempts to determine if the progenitor star is still present have been extensive and have included use of both the Hubble Space Telescope and the Spitzer Space Telescope. These attempts have been hampered by the cloud of debris from the event, which have left the area obscured.

Christopher Kochanek at Ohio State University has compared the event to the confirmed supernova SN 2005gl and suggested that the low velocity of expansion can be explained by a pre-supernova mass loss event similar to that which was observed to occur in SN 2005gl. The analysis by Kochanek's group strongly suggests that SN 1961V was indeed a genuine supernova. Almost at the same moment, another team detected a highly luminous blue star, labeled Object 7, remaining at the site of the supernova, although they couldn't rule out this being a surviving companion of the exploded star.
