= NGC 996 =

Galaxy in the constellation Andromeda

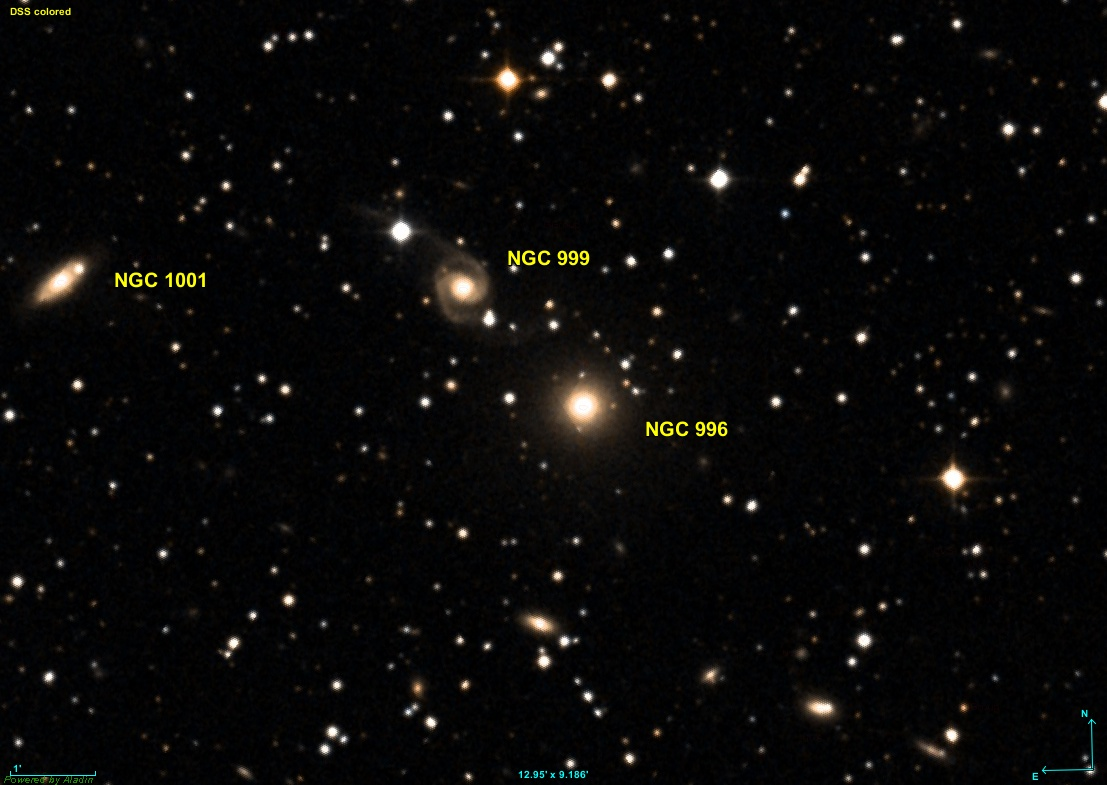
- DSS image of NGC 996 (center)

Observation data (J2000 epoch)
- Constellation: Andromeda
- Right ascension: 02^{h} 38^{m} 39.865^{s}
- Declination: +41° 38′ 51.27″
- Redshift: 0.015409
- Heliocentric radial velocity: 4584 km/s
- Distance: 203.3 Mly (62.34 Mpc)
- Apparent magnitude (B): 14.5

Characteristics
- Type: E

Other designations
- UGC 2123, MCG +07-06-045, PGC 10015, CGCG 539-064

NGC 996 is an elliptical galaxy of the Hubble type E0 in the constellation Andromeda. It is estimated to be 210 million light years from the Milky Way and has a diameter of approximately 75,000 ly. It was discovered on December 7, 1871 by astronomer Édouard Stephan.

== Supernova ==
One supernova has been observed in NGC 996: SN 1996bq (type unknown, mag. 18.7) was discovered by Christian Pollas on 12 October 1996.

== See also ==
- List of NGC objects (1–1000)
