= NGC 1058 =

Galaxy in constellation Perseus

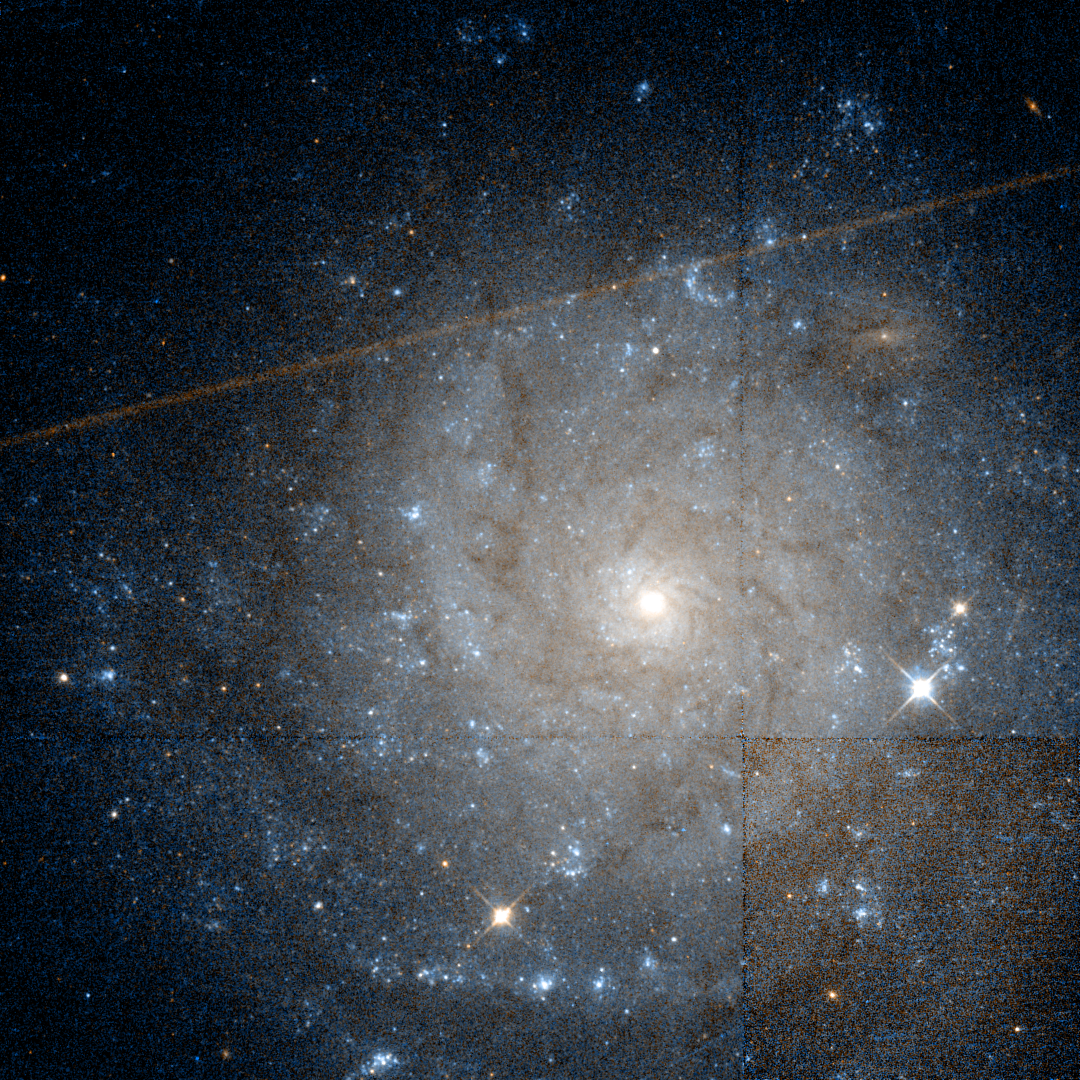
- NGC 1058 imaged by the Hubble Space Telescope; Credit: NASA/ESA

Observation data (J2000 epoch)
- Constellation: Perseus
- Right ascension: 02^{h} 43^{m} 30.24^{s}
- Declination: +37° 20′ 27.2″
- Redshift: 0.001728±0.000003
- Heliocentric radial velocity: 518±1 km/s
- Galactocentric velocity: 629±5 km/s
- Distance: 27.4 ± 4 Mly (8.40 ± 1.23 Mpc)
- Apparent magnitude (V): 11.82

Characteristics
- Type: SA(rs)c
- Apparent size (V): 3.801 x 3.715 moa

Other designations
- UGC 2193, PGC 10314, CGCG 523-096, MCG +06-07-001

NGC 1058 is a Seyfert Type 2 galaxy in the NGC 1023 Group, located in the constellation Perseus. It is approximately 27.4 million light years from Earth and has an apparent magnitude of 11.82. It is receding from Earth at 518 kilometers per second (322 mi/s), and at 629 kilometers per second (391 mi/s) relative to the Milky Way.

== Supernovae ==
Three supernovae have been observed in NGC 1058:

- SN 1961V (Type II-P, or possibly type LBV, mag. 12.2) was discovered by Paul Wild on 11 July 1961.
- SN 1969L (Type II, mag. 12.8) was discovered by Leonida Rosino on 2 December 1969.
- SN 2007gr (Type Ib/c, mag. 13.8) was discovered by the Lick Observatory Supernova Search (LOSS) on 15 August 2007.

== Image gallery ==
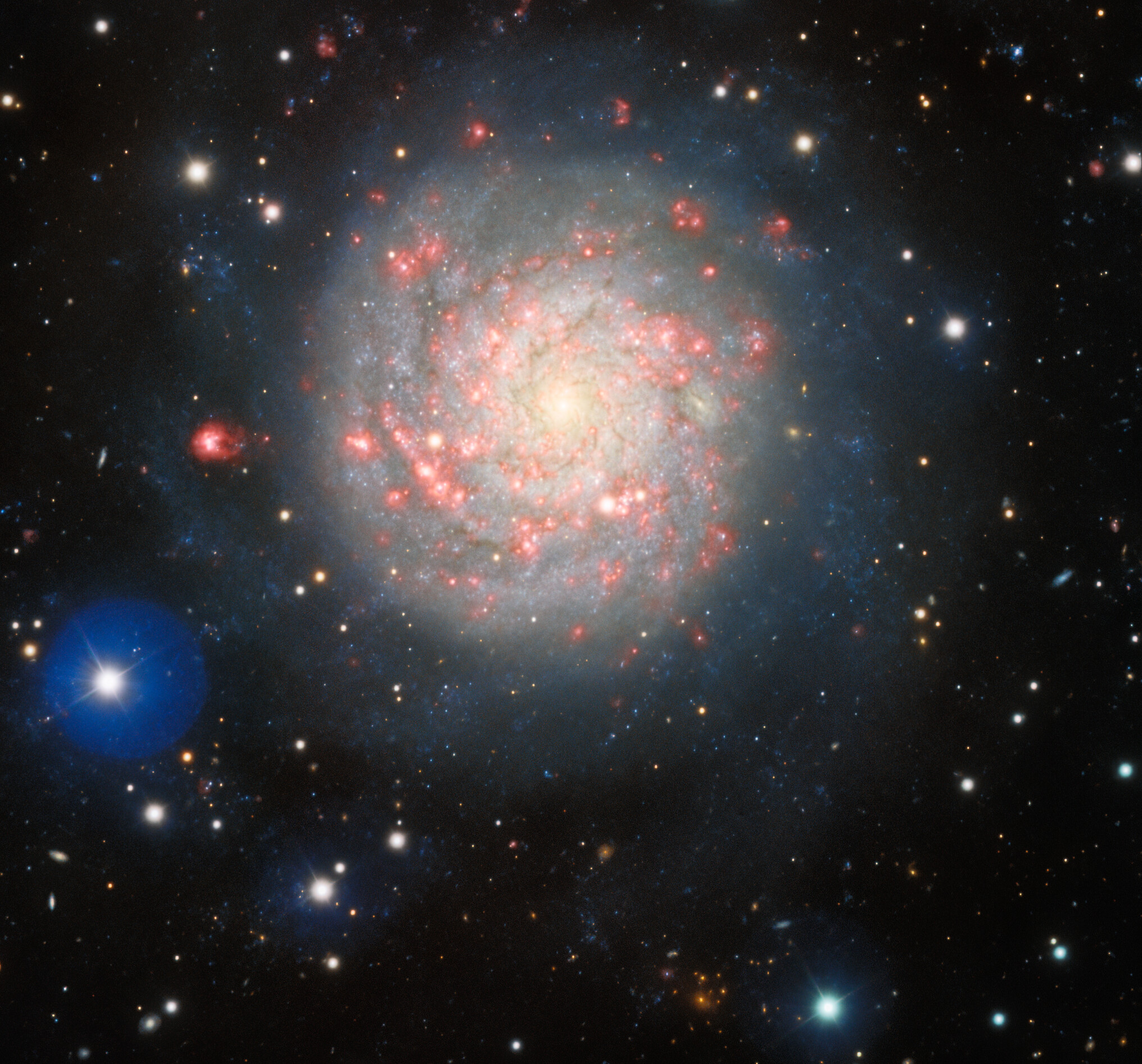
NGC 1058 imaged by the Gemini North Telescope
