= Siu Au Lee =

American physicist

Siu Au Lee is an American physicist known for her use of visible and ultraviolet light lasers, including using them to perform atomic-scale interferometry based on Bragg scattering, test special relativity and other fundamental theories, perform photolithography, and supply cooled heavy nuclei for quantum computing applications.

== Education and career ==
Lee is a 1970 graduate of the University of Wisconsin–Madison, and completed her Ph.D. in 1976 at Stanford University. She was a professor of physics at Colorado State University for over 30 years, with time on leave as a program manager at the National Science Foundation, until retiring to become a professor emerita.

== Recognition ==
Lee was elected as a Fellow of the American Physical Society (APS) in 1998, after a nomination from the APS Topical Group on Precision Measurement & Fundamental Constants, "for contributions to the field of high resolution laser spectroscopy, and for precision experiments in hydrogen and in tests of special relativity". She is also aan OSA Fellow, elected in 1992.

She was named a distinguished alumna of the University of Wisconsin–Madison physics program for 2015–2016.
