= NGC 1000 =

Galaxy in the constellation Andromeda

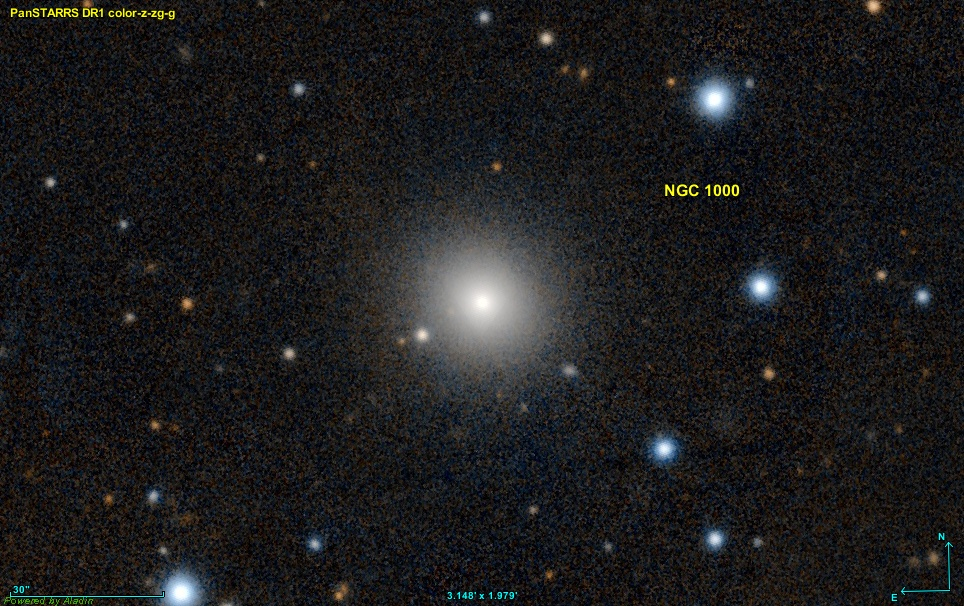
- Pan-STARRS image of NGC 1000

Observation data (J2000 epoch)
- Constellation: Andromeda
- Right ascension: 02^{h} 38^{m} 49.7^{s}
- Declination: +41° 27′ 35″
- Redshift: 0.014663
- Heliocentric radial velocity: 4,396 km/s
- Distance: 195.1 Mly (59.82 Mpc)
- Apparent magnitude (V): 15.6

Characteristics
- Type: cE
- Apparent size (V): 0.8′ × 0.7′

Other designations
- 2MASXi J0238497+412735, 2MASX J02384973+4127352, NGC 1000, MCG +07-06-048, PGC 10028, CGCG 539-067, 0235.7+4115

NGC 1000 is an elliptical galaxy located in the northern constellation of Andromeda. It was discovered on December 9, 1871 by French astronomer Édouard Jean-Marie Stephan. It is the 1,000th object included in the New General Catalogue.

NGC 1000 has an apparent visual magnitude of 15.6 and an angular size of 0.8′ × 0.7′. It is located at a distance of 195.1 million light-years (59.82 Mpc) from the Milky Way.

== See also ==
- List of NGC objects (1–1000)
