= NGC 1023 Group =

Group of galaxies about 20.6 million light-years from Earth

Observation data (Epoch )
- Constellation(s): Andromeda, Perseus, Triangulum
- Brightest member: NGC 1023
- Number of galaxies: ~23 plus 42 candidate members
- Distance: 20.6 Mly (6.3 Mpc)

The NGC 1023 Group is a group of galaxies about 20.6 million light-years (6.3 Mpc) away from Earth. It is a group in the Local Supercluster, along with the Local Group.

== Members ==
Members of the group
Name	Type	Magnitude
NGC 1023	SB(rs)0	10.65
NGC 925	SAB(s)d	10.96
NGC 959	Sdm:	12.38
NGC 891	SA(s)b	11.24
NGC 1239	SAB(rs)cd	12.14
NGC 1058	SA(rs)c	12.26
NGC 1003	SAcd	12.1
NGC 949	SA(rs)b?	11.8
NGC 959	Sdm?	12.4
IC 239	SAB(rs)cd	11.1
UGC 2034	Im	13.1
UGC 2023	Im?	13.0
UGC 2165	dE,N	13.7
UGC 2126	SABdm?	13.98
UGC 2157	Sdm?	13.99
NGC 1023A	IB?	12.7
UGC 2014	Im?	14.5
UGC 1865	Sm?	14.42
NGC 1023C	dE/I	16.31
NGC 1023B	dI	16.35
NGC 1023D	dE/I	16.51
GALEXASC J024016.48+373731.1	dE,N	16.66
NGC 1023 GROUP:[TT2009] 42	dE	19.25

- Probable (dwarfs): DDO 024, DDO 025.
- Possible members: NGC 672, IC 1727, NGC 1156(?).
- Possible (dwarfs): DDO 011, DDO 017, DDO 019, DDO 022, DDO 026.

== Map ==
The location of the NGC 1023 group within the Virgo Supercluster (as part of the Laniakea Supercluster) can be found near the center of this diagram - below the blue "Local Group" mark.
