= NGC 1003 =

Spiral galaxy in the constellation Perseus

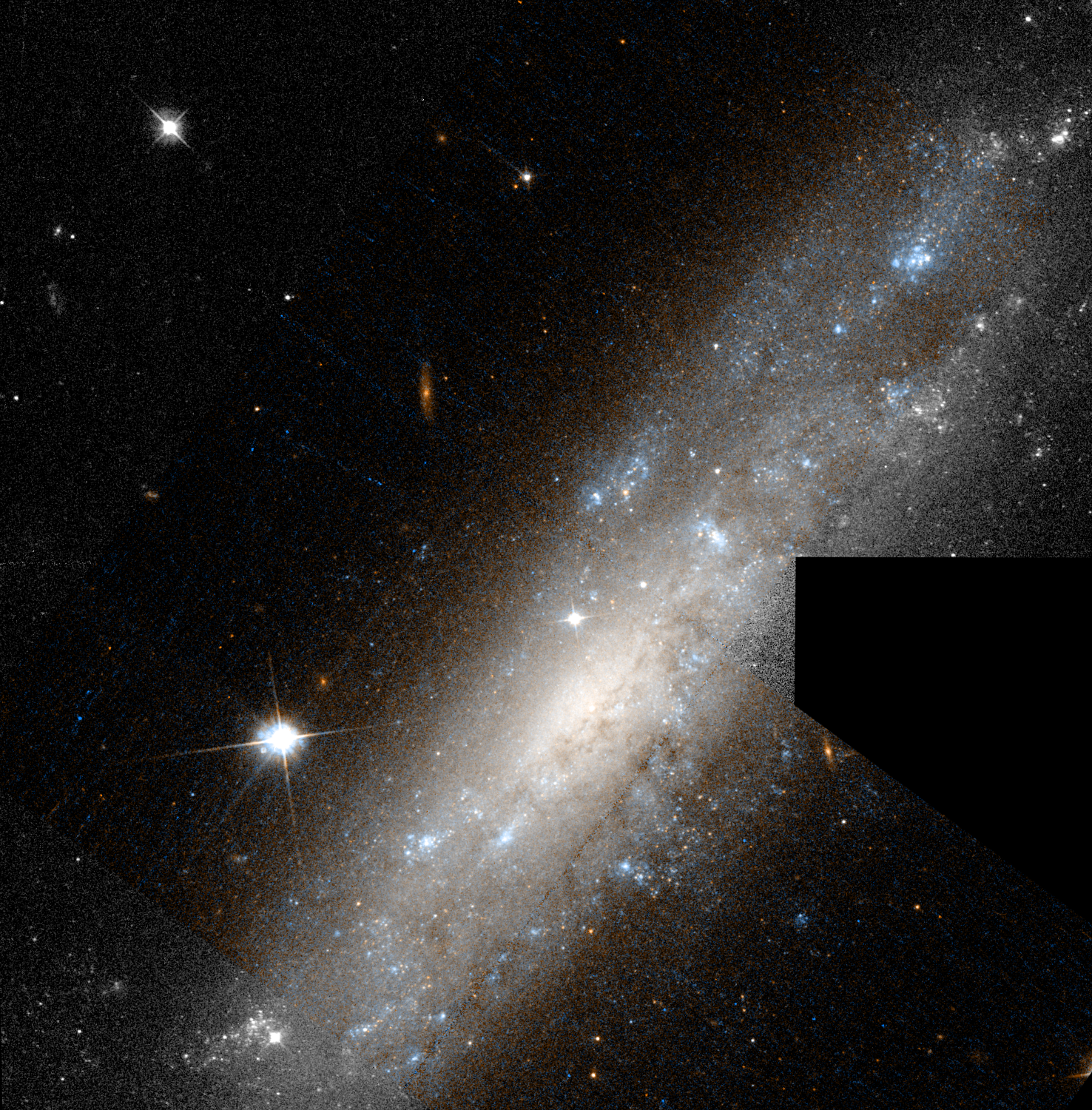
- NGC 1003 from the Hubble Space Telescope

Observation data (J2000 epoch)
- Constellation: Perseus
- Right ascension: 02^{h} 39^{m} 16.893^{s}
- Declination: +40° 52′ 20.25″
- Redshift: 0.002090
- Heliocentric radial velocity: 624 km/s
- Distance: 30.94 ± 1.40 Mly (9.486 ± 0.429 Mpc)
- Group or cluster: NGC 1023 group
- Apparent magnitude (B): 12.1

Characteristics
- Type: SAcd
- Mass: 299+28 −26×10^{10} M_{☉}
- Mass/Light ratio: 0.70+0.16 −0.15 M_{☉}/L_{☉}
- Size: ~63,000 ly (19.32 kpc) (estimated)
- Notable features: Warped disk

Other designations
- IRAS 02360+4039, UGC 2137, MCG +07-06-051, PGC 10052

NGC 1003 is a spiral galaxy at the western edge of the constellation Perseus. It is located at a distance of about 36 million light years from the Milky Way and is receding with a heliocentric radial velocity of 624 km/s. This galaxy was discovered by the Anglo-German astronomer William Herschel on October 6, 1784, who described it as "pretty faint, large, extended 90°±, much brighter middle, mottled but not resolved". It is a member of the NGC 1023 group of galaxies.

The morphological class of NGC 1003 is SAcd, which means it is an unbarred spiral galaxy (SA) with somewhat loosely-wound spiral arms (cd). It is inclined by an angle of 70° to the line of sight from the Earth, with the major axis aligned along a position angle of 276°. The visual disk of the galaxy shows a substantial warping in the eastern side, turning it almost face on. The estimated star formation rate is 0.40 M_{☉}·yr^{−1}. It has a virial mass of 3×10^{12} M_{☉} and a mass-to-light ratio of 0.7.

== Supernova ==
One supernova has been observed in NGC 1003: SN 1937D (Type Ia, mag. 10.5) was discovered by Fritz Zwicky on 9 September 1937.

== Gallery ==
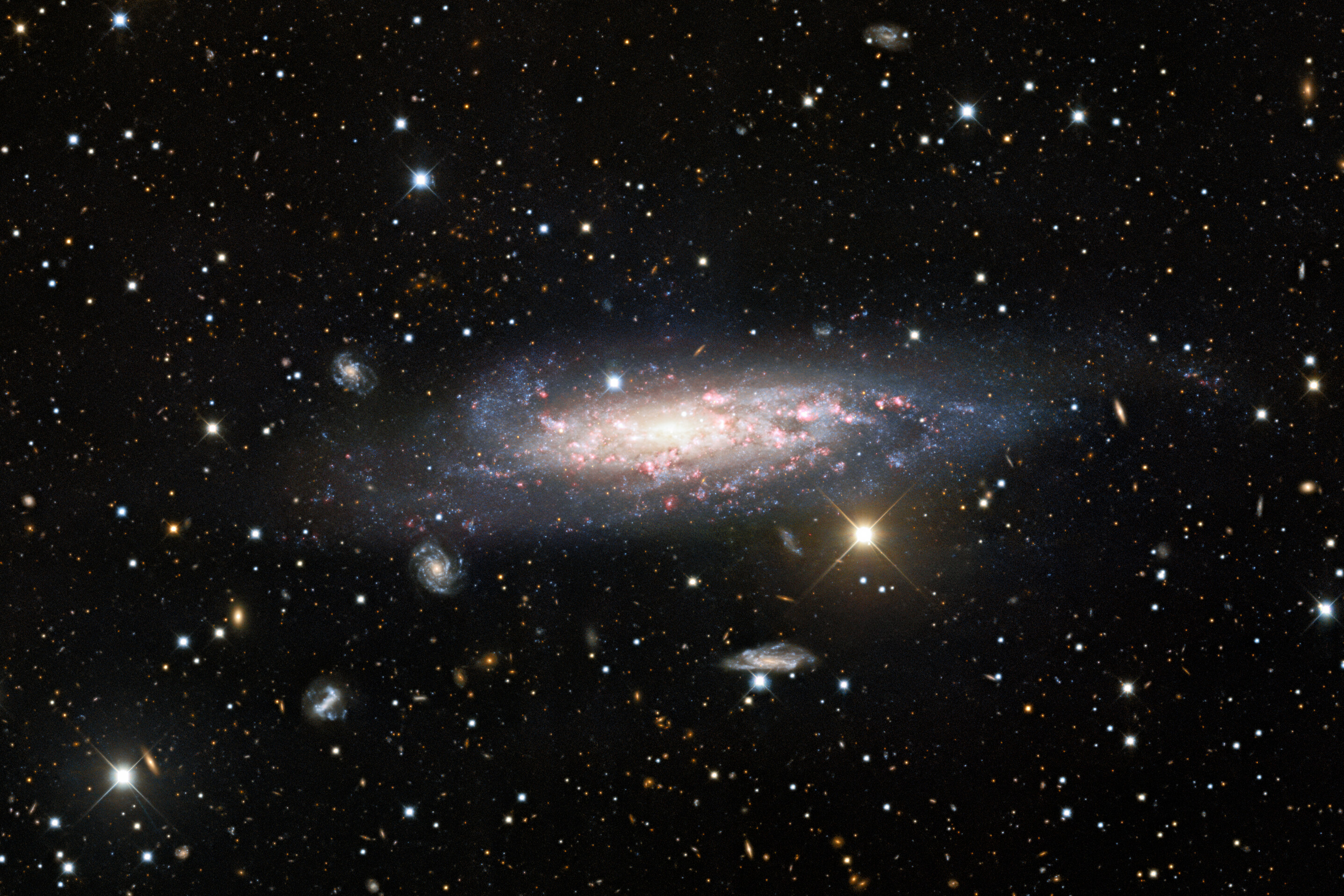
NGC 1003 taken from the Nicholas U. Mayall Telescope at Kitt Peak National Observatory.

== See also ==
- List of NGC objects (1001–2000)
