= NGC 1001 =

Galaxy in the constellation Perseus

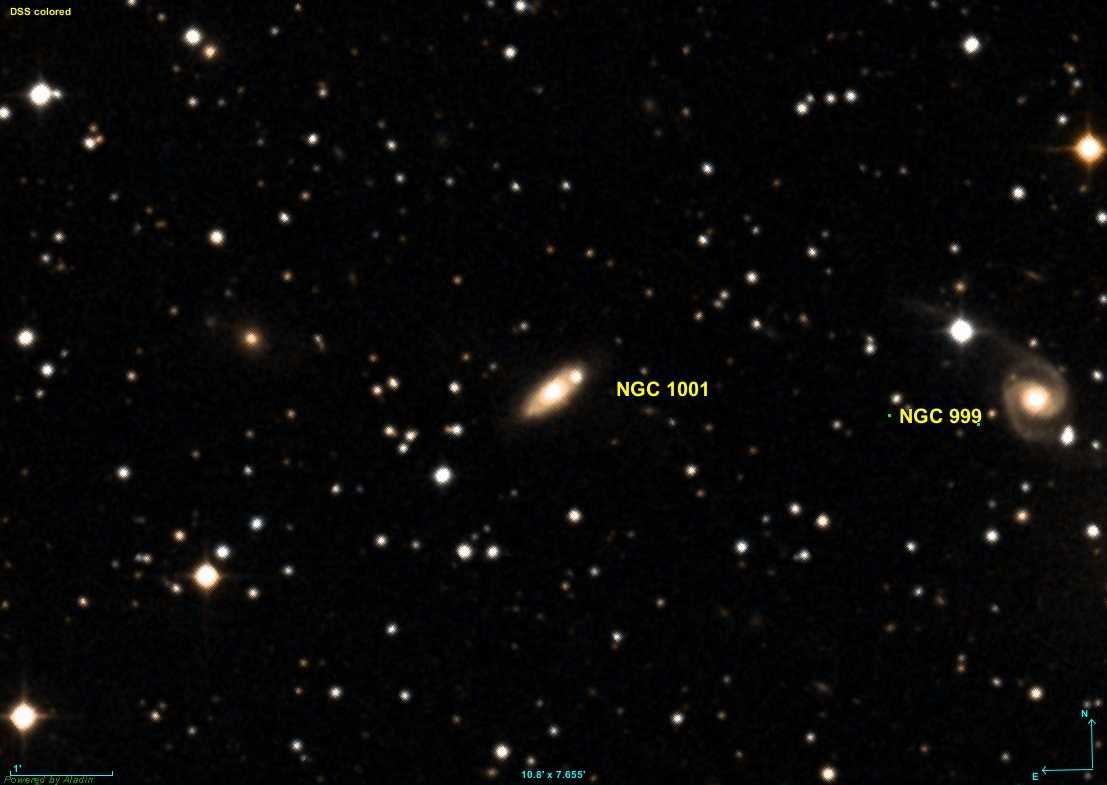
- DSS image of NGC 1001

Observation data (J2000 epoch)
- Constellation: Perseus
- Right ascension: 02^{h} 39^{m} 12.66965^{s}
- Declination: +41° 40′ 18.1097″
- Redshift: 0.015591
- Heliocentric radial velocity: 4638 ± 23 km/s
- Distance: 206.6 Mly (63.33 Mpc)
- Apparent magnitude (B): 14.7

Characteristics
- Type: (R')S(s)0/a?
- Apparent size (V): 0.740′ × 0.355′

Other designations
- MCG +07-06-050, PGC 10050

NGC 1001 is an unbarred spiral galaxy in the constellation Perseus. It was discovered on December 8, 1871 by the astronomer Édouard Stephan.

The morphological classification of NGC 1001 is (R')S(s)0/a?, which indicates a generally spiral form (S) with an outer generic pseudoring (R'), no inner ring structure (s), and either lenticular or tightly wound spiral arms.

== See also ==
- List of NGC objects (1001–2000)
