= NGC 1023 =

Galaxy in the constellation Perseus

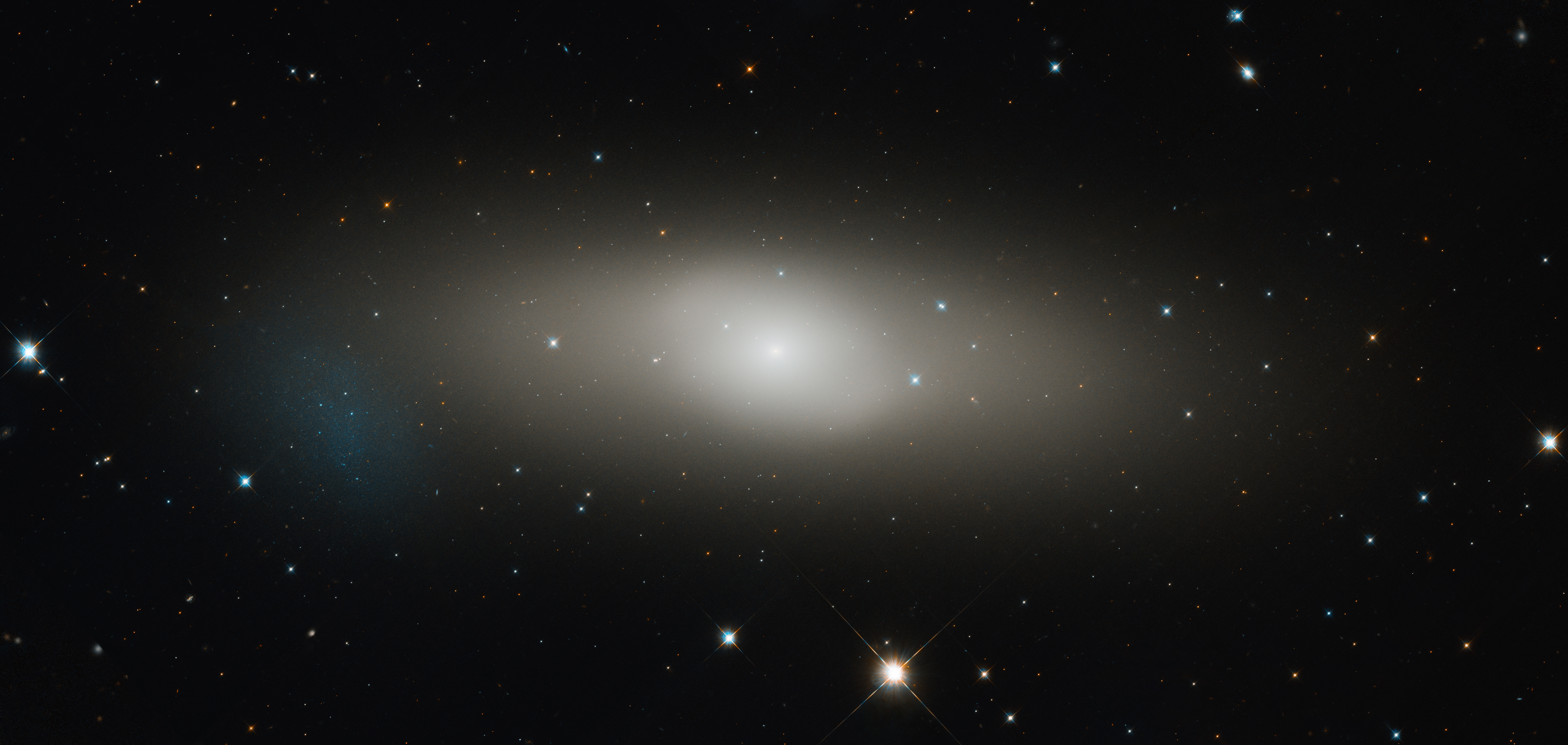
- Hubble Space Telescope image of NGC 1023

Observation data (J2000 epoch)
- Constellation: Perseus
- Right ascension: 02^{h} 40^{m} 24.0^{s}
- Declination: +39° 03′ 48″
- Redshift: 0.002125
- Heliocentric radial velocity: 637 ± 4 km/s
- Distance: ~19 Mly (Light Travel-Time redshift-based); 30 to 64 Mly (measured)
- Apparent magnitude (V): 10.35
- Absolute magnitude (V): −21.2

Characteristics
- Type: SB0
- Apparent size (V): 8.7' x 3.0'

Other designations
- NGC 1023, Arp 135, UGC 2154, MCG +06-06-073, PGC 10123

NGC 1023 is a barred lenticular galaxy in the northern constellation of Perseus. Alternatively, it is known as the Perseus Lenticular Galaxy. Distance measurements vary from 9.3 to 19.7 million parsecs (30 to 64 million light-years), where it is a member of the NGC 1023 group of galaxies in the Local Supercluster. NGC 1023 is included in Halton Arp's Atlas of Peculiar Galaxies, under the category "Galaxies with Nearby Fragments" under the number 135.

NGC 1023 has been estimated to have about 490 globular clusters, consistent with similar early-type galaxies. There is a supermassive black hole at the core with a mass of (4.4±0.5)×10^{7} M_{☉}. The black hole was discovered by analyzing the dynamics of the galaxy.

A number of small galaxies have been found around NGC 1023, the collection of which is labelled the "NGC 1023 Group." The shape and motion of the neutral hydrogen gas around NGC 1023 suggest that it underwent a tidal interaction with one of its dwarf companions some time in the past. NGC 1023 has a satellite galaxy named NGC 1023A, which is a Magellanic spiral galaxy; its globular cluster system is much smaller, estimated to be around six individuals. A bridge of neutral hydrogen extends from NGC 1023 to NGC 1023A, which may indicate a possible interaction.
