= ALFALFA =

Astronomical survey

- Website: egg.astro.cornell.edu/alfalfa/

The ALFALFA research project was located at the Arecibo Observatory. Observations were conducted from 2005 to 2011. The name is an abbreviation of Arecibo Legacy Fast ALFA. ALFA is the abbreviation of Arecibo L-Band Feed Array.

The ALFA was a seven pixel detector and thus seven times faster than the previously used one pixel detectors. It was utilized in combination with the Arecibo Observatory telescope, a 305-meter radio telescope, which was the largest single-dish telescope in the world until July 2016, offering the best resolution and sensitivity at the time of survey.

The speed of the ALFA permitted it to survey large areas of the sky quickly, while the telescope provided unequalled sensitivity. With the seven feeds it was also possible to detect structures which are too big to be seen with radio interferometers or single-pixel detectors.

The ALFALFA survey was a blind extragalactic survey in neutral atomic hydrogen (HI) utilizing the ALFA at Arecibo Observatory. The telescope was not directed at preselected targets, but at one location for one night, allowing the sky to pass. This is called drift-scan. The goal was to find up to 25,000 galaxies in the course of 6–7 years. Some of the detected objects should be dark galaxies, consisting largely of dark matter and in this case hydrogen gas, but no or very few stars. These galaxies are not visible with optical telescopes.

Similar projects are HIPASS and HIJASS.
