= List of stars in Triangulum =

This is a list of notable stars in the constellation Triangulum, sorted by decreasing brightness.

Name	B	F	Var	HD	HIP	RA	Dec	vis. mag.	abs. mag.	Dist. (ly)	Sp. class	Notes
β Tri	β	4		13161	10064	02^{h} 09^{m} 32.52^{s}	+34° 59′ 14.6″	3.00	0.09	124	A5III	Alaybasan
α Tri	α	2		11443	8796	01^{h} 53^{m} 04.90^{s}	+29° 34′ 45.8″	3.42	1.95	64	F6IV	Mothallah, Ras al Mothallah, Caput Trianguli; rotating ellipsoidal variable
γ Tri	γ	9		14055	10670	02^{h} 17^{m} 18.84^{s}	+33° 50′ 50.4″	4.03	1.24	118	A1Vnn	Apdu
δ Tri	δ	8		13974	10644	02^{h} 17^{m} 02.42^{s}	+34° 13′ 29.4″	4.84	4.66	35	G0V	Deltoton
ι Tri	ι	6	TZ	13480	10280	02^{h} 12^{m} 22.32^{s}	+30° 18′ 11.6″	4.94	0.08	305	F5V comp SB	Triminus, RS CVn variable, ΔV = 0.09^{m}, P = 14.732 d
14 Tri		14		15656	11784	02^{h} 32^{m} 06.14^{s}	+36° 08′ 50.0″	5.15	−0.25	391	K5III	variable star, ΔV = 0.006^{m}, P = 0.08576 d
7 Tri	η	7		13869	10559	02^{h} 15^{m} 56.30^{s}	+33° 21′ 32.3″	5.25	0.48	293	A0V	
10 Tri	a	10		14252	10793	02^{h} 18^{m} 56.99^{s}	+28° 38′ 33.6″	5.29	0.13	350	A2V	
12 Tri	c	12		15257	11486	02^{h} 28^{m} 09.99^{s}	+29° 40′ 10.3″	5.29	1.90	155	F0III	
15 Tri		15		16058	12086	02^{h} 35^{m} 46.80^{s}	+34° 41′ 15.7″	5.38			M3III	suspected slow irregular variable, ΔV = 0.14^{m}
R Tri			R	16210	12193	02^{h} 37^{m} 02.50^{s}	+34° 15′ 50.0″	5.40		1299	M4IIIe	Mira variable, V_{max} = 5.4^{m}, V_{min} = 12.6^{m}, P = 266.9 d
ε Tri	ε	3		12471	9570	02^{h} 02^{m} 57.97^{s}	+33° 17′ 02.9″	5.50	0.22	370	A2V	binary star
11 Tri	d	11		15176	11432	02^{h} 27^{m} 27.79^{s}	+31° 48′ 04.9″	5.55	0.83	286	K1III:	
HD 10390				10390	7943	01^{h} 42^{m} 03.45^{s}	+35° 14′ 44.8″	5.63	1.13	259	B9IV-V	
HD 11007				11007	8433	01^{h} 48^{m} 41.68^{s}	+32° 41′ 22.2″	5.78	3.60	89	F8V	
HD 11928				11928	9132	01^{h} 57^{m} 43.74^{s}	+27° 48′ 16.3″	5.84	0.02	476	M2III	variable star, ΔV = 0.013^{m}, P = 50.65856 d
HD 15755				15755	11840	02^{h} 32^{m} 52.66^{s}	+34° 32′ 32.8″	5.84	1.33	260	K0III	
13 Tri		13		15335	11548	02^{h} 28^{m} 48.54^{s}	+29° 55′ 53.7″	5.89	3.45	100	G0V	
HD 10348				10348	7906	01^{h} 41^{m} 39.24^{s}	+30° 02′ 49.7″	5.97	−0.06	523	K0III	
HD 16187				16187	12160	02^{h} 36^{m} 43.05^{s}	+31° 36′ 27.6″	6.07	0.36	452	K0	
HD 16220				16220	12200	02^{h} 37^{m} 06.51^{s}	+32° 53′ 27.7″	6.23	2.52	180	F8V	
5 Tri		5		13372	10220	02^{h} 11^{m} 25.00^{s}	+31° 31′ 35.1″	6.24	0.39	482	A1m	
HD 15464				15464	11651	02^{h} 30^{m} 16.56^{s}	+33° 50′ 01.8″	6.26	0.98	371	K1III	variable star, ΔV = 0.005^{m}, P = 0.26973 d
HD 10588				10588	8086	01^{h} 43^{m} 50.15^{s}	+32° 11′ 31.2″	6.32	0.57	460	G8III-IV SB	
HD 13747				13747	10446	02^{h} 14^{m} 37.88^{s}	+28° 41′ 29.1″	6.35	2.48	194	K1III	
HD 9298				9298	7147	01^{h} 32^{m} 07.58^{s}	+34° 47′ 59.9″	6.39	−0.90	937	B7IIIMNp...	
1 Tri		1		1047	7948	01^{h} 42^{m} 05.92^{s}	+29° 30′ 21.85″	7.52	0.78	730	A2V	
HD 13189				13189	10085	02^{h} 09^{m} 40.17^{s}	+32° 18′ 59.2″	7.57	1.23	602	K3II	has a planet or a brown dwarf companion (b)
HD 9446				9446	7245	01^{h} 33^{m} 20.18^{s}	+29° 15′ 54.5″	8.35	4.74	172	G5V	has two planets (b & c)
HD 12545			XX	12545	9630	02^{h} 03^{m} 47.11^{s}	+35° 35′ 28.7″	8.42		522	K0III	RS CVn variable, V_{max} = 8.1^{m}, V_{min} = 8.7^{m}, P = 24.26007 d
X Tri			X	12211	9383	02^{h} 00^{m} 33.72^{s}	+27° 53′ 19.3″	8.86	2.76	541	A7V	Algol variable, V_{max} = 8.55^{m}, V_{min} = 11.27^{m}, P = 0.9715352 d
V Tri			V			01^{h} 31^{m} 47.10^{s}	+30° 22′ 01.6″	10.96			A3	β Lyr variable, V_{max} = 10.7^{m}, V_{min} = 11.8^{m}, P = 0.5852057 d
RV Tri			RV			02^{h} 13^{m} 18.16^{s}	+31° 01′ 01.6″	11.21			A2:	Algol variable
WASP-56						12^{h} 13^{m} 27.89^{s}	+23° 03′ 20.45″	11.46			G6	has a planet
RW Tri			RW			02^{h} 25^{m} 36.15^{s}	+28° 05′ 50.9″	12.50			M0V	Algol variable and nova-like star, V_{max} = 12.5^{m}, V_{min} = 15.61^{m}, P = 0.231883392 d
HAT-P-38						02^{h} 21^{m} 31.9^{s}	+32° 14′ 47″	12.56		812	G	Horna; has a planet (b)
AI Tri			AI			02^{h} 03^{m} 48.61^{s}	+29° 59′ 25.8″	15.30			M2.5	AM Her variable, V_{max} = 14.7^{m}, V_{min} = 18.2^{m}, P = 0.19174566 d
Var 83						01^{h} 34^{m} 10.91^{s}	+30° 34′ 37.4″	15.40		3000000		in Triangulum Galaxy; luminous blue variable, V_{max} = 15.4^{m}, V_{min} = 16.6^{m}; one of the most luminous stars known
Var B						01^{h} 33^{m} 49.20^{s}	+30° 38′ 09.1″	16.21		3000000	A	in Triangulum Galaxy; luminous blue variable; one of the most luminous stars known
Var C						01^{h} 33^{m} 35.14^{s}	+30° 36′ 00.4″	16.43		3000000	B	in Triangulum Galaxy; luminous blue variable, V_{max} = 15.2^{m}, V_{min} = 17.2^{m}; one of the most luminous stars known
Var 19						01^{h} 33^{m} 57.1^{s}	+30° 45′ 12″	18.20		3000000		in Triangulum Galaxy; formerly thought to be a Cepheid variable
M33 X-7						01^{h} 33^{m} 34.13^{s}	+30° 32′ 11.3″	18.70		3000000	O6III	in Triangulum Galaxy; High-mass X-ray binary; contains largest known stellar black hole
Var A						01^{h} 32^{m} 32.52^{s}	+30° 30′ 22.4″			3000000	F8Ia	in Triangulum Galaxy; luminous blue variable; one of the most luminous stars known
Var 2			Y			01^{h} 34^{m} 18.4^{s}	+30° 38′ 27″			3000000	Ofpe/WN9	in Triangulum Galaxy; luminous blue variable; one of the most luminous stars known
LSPM J0207+3331						02^{h} 07^{m} 33.81^{s}	+33° 31′ 29.53″			145	DA	oldest white dwarf to host a circumstellar disk
Table legend: • Name = Proper name • B = Bayer designation • F or/and G. = Flamsteed designation or Gould designation • Var = Variable-star designation • HD = Henry Draper Catalogue designation number • HIP = Hipparcos Catalogue designation number • RA = Right ascension for the Epoch/Equinox J2000.0 • Dec = Declination for the Epoch/Equinox J2000.0 • vis. mag. = visual magnitude (m or m_{v}), also known as apparent magnitude • abs. mag. = absolute magnitude (M_{v}) • Dist. (ly) = Distance in light-years from Earth • Sp. class = Spectral class of the star in the stellar classification system • Notes = Common name(s) or alternate name(s); comments; notable properties [for example: multiple star status, range of variability if it is a variable star, exoplanets, etc.]

== See also ==
- List of stars by constellation
