= Triangulum in Chinese astronomy =

According to traditional Chinese uranography, the modern constellation Triangulum is located within the western quadrant of the sky, which is symbolized as the White Tiger of the West (西方白虎) (西方白虎, Xī Fāng Bái Hǔ).

The name of the western constellation in modern Chinese is 三角座 (sān jiǎo zuò), meaning "the triangle constellation".

== Stars ==
The map of Chinese constellation in constellation Triangulum area consists of:

Four Symbols	Mansion (Chinese name)	Romanization	Translation	Asterisms (Chinese name)	Romanization	Translation	Western star name	Proper Name	Chinese star name	Romanization	Translation
White Tiger of the West (西方白虎)
White Tiger of the West (西方白虎)	奎	Kuí	Legs	奎	Kuí	Legs	1 Tri		奎宿增十二	Kuísùzēngshíèr	12th additional star
White Tiger of the West (西方白虎)	婁	Lóu	Bond	婁	Lóu	Bond					
White Tiger of the West (西方白虎)	婁	Lóu	Bond	婁	Lóu	Bond	α Tri	Mothallah			
White Tiger of the West (西方白虎)	婁	Lóu	Bond	婁	Lóu	Bond	α Tri	Mothallah	婁宿增六	Lóusùzēngliù	6th additional star
White Tiger of the West (西方白虎)	婁	Lóu	Bond	婁	Lóu	Bond	α Tri	Mothallah	天溷西南星	Tiānhùnxīnánxīng	Star in the west of Celestial Pigsty
White Tiger of the West (西方白虎)	婁	Lóu	Bond	天大將軍	Tiāndàjiāngjūn	Heaven's Great General					
White Tiger of the West (西方白虎)	婁	Lóu	Bond	天大將軍	Tiāndàjiāngjūn	Heaven's Great General	β Tri	Alaybasan			
White Tiger of the West (西方白虎)	婁	Lóu	Bond	天大將軍	Tiāndàjiāngjūn	Heaven's Great General	β Tri	Alaybasan	天大將軍九	Tiāndàjiāngjūnjiǔ	9th star
White Tiger of the West (西方白虎)	婁	Lóu	Bond	天大將軍	Tiāndàjiāngjūn	Heaven's Great General	β Tri	Alaybasan	天大将军南大星	Tiāndàjiāngjūnnándàxīng	Big star in the south
White Tiger of the West (西方白虎)	婁	Lóu	Bond	天大將軍	Tiāndàjiāngjūn	Heaven's Great General	β Tri	Alaybasan	鈇鑕中北星	Fūzhìzhōngběixīng	Star in the center-north of Sickle
White Tiger of the West (西方白虎)	婁	Lóu	Bond	天大將軍	Tiāndàjiāngjūn	Heaven's Great General	γ Tri	Apdu	天大將軍十	Tiāndàjiāngjūnshí	10th star
White Tiger of the West (西方白虎)	婁	Lóu	Bond	天大將軍	Tiāndàjiāngjūn	Heaven's Great General	δ Tri	Deltoton	天大將軍十一	Tiāndàjiāngjūnshíyī	11th star
White Tiger of the West (西方白虎)	婁	Lóu	Bond	天大將軍	Tiāndàjiāngjūn	Heaven's Great General	ε Tri		天大将军增五	Tiāndàjiāngjūnzēngwǔ	5th additional star
White Tiger of the West (西方白虎)	婁	Lóu	Bond	天大將軍	Tiāndàjiāngjūn	Heaven's Great General	ι Tri	Triminus	天大将军增六	Tiāndàjiāngjūnzēngliù	6th additional star
White Tiger of the West (西方白虎)	婁	Lóu	Bond	天大將軍	Tiāndàjiāngjūn	Heaven's Great General	7 Tri		天大将军增七	Tiāndàjiāngjūnzēngqī	7th additional star
White Tiger of the West (西方白虎)	婁	Lóu	Bond	天大將軍	Tiāndàjiāngjūn	Heaven's Great General	14 Tri		天大将军增八	Tiāndàjiāngjūnzēngbā	8th additional star
White Tiger of the West (西方白虎)	胃	Wèi	Stomach	胃	Wèi	Stomach					
White Tiger of the West (西方白虎)	胃	Wèi	Stomach	胃	Wèi	Stomach	10 Tri		胃宿增一	Wèisùzēngyī	1st additional star
White Tiger of the West (西方白虎)	胃	Wèi	Stomach	胃	Wèi	Stomach	12 Tri		胃宿增二	Wèisùzēngèr	2nd additional star

== See also ==
- Traditional Chinese star names
- Chinese constellations
