= NGC 672 =

Galaxy in the constellation Triangulum

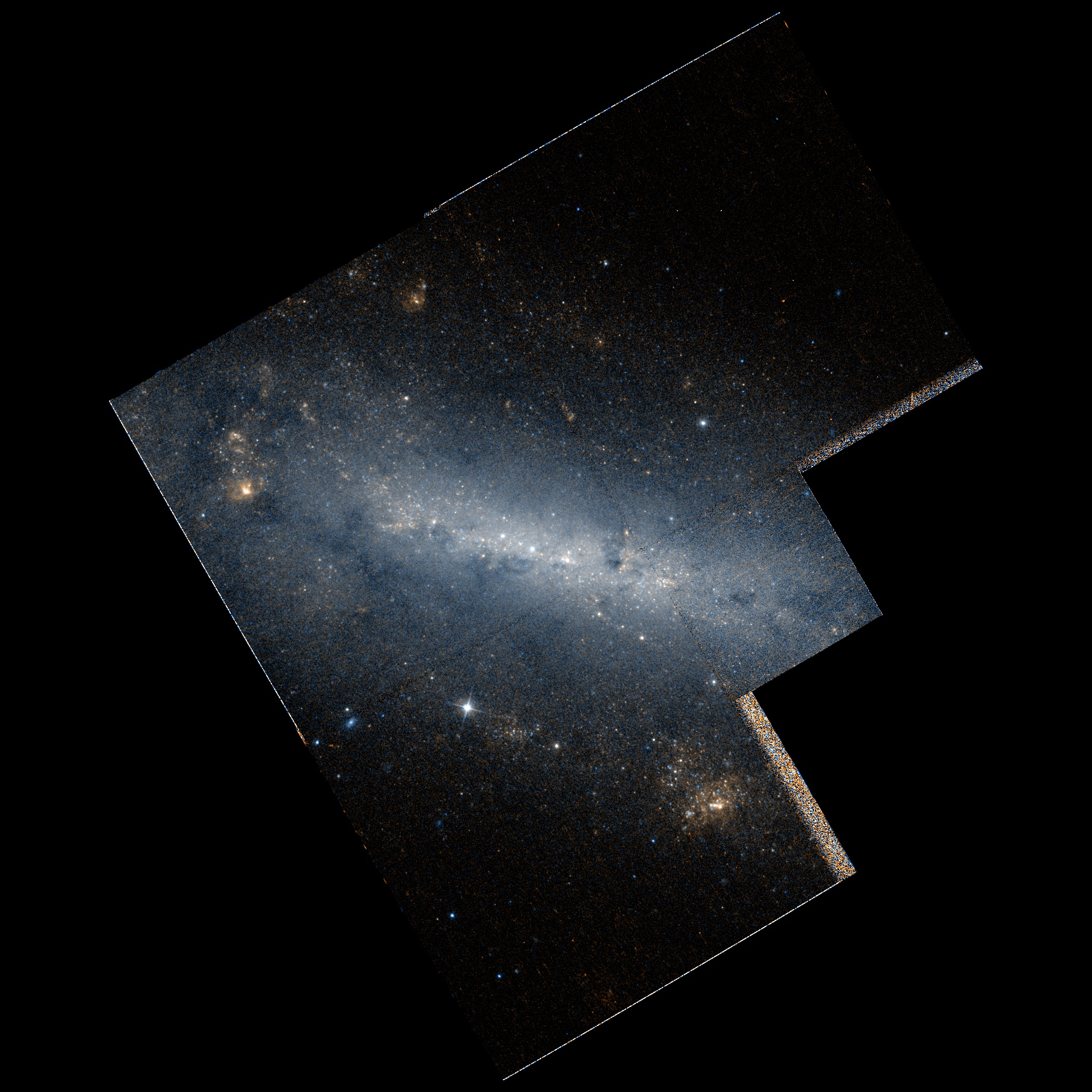
- NGC 672, imaged by the Hubble Space Telescope

Observation data (J2000 epoch)
- Constellation: Triangulum
- Right ascension: 01^{h} 47^{m} 54.47627^{s}
- Declination: +27° 25′ 57.9948″
- Redshift: 0.001403
- Heliocentric radial velocity: 425 km/s
- Distance: 23.42 ± 0.33 Mly (7.18 ± 0.10 Mpc)
- Apparent magnitude (V): 11.09±0.03

Characteristics
- Type: SB(s)cd
- Mass: 3.8×10^{10} M_{☉} M_{☉}
- Apparent size (V): 6′.17 × 2′.29

Other designations
- MCG+04-05-011, VV 338, 2MASX J01475452+2725580, IRAS 01450+2710, NGC 672, UGC 1256, PGC 6595

NGC 672 is a spiral galaxy in the northern constellation of Triangulum, positioned around 2° to the southwest of the star Alpha Trianguli. The original object designated NGC 672 was discovered by the German-born astronomer William Herschel on 26 October 1786, but this was later cataloged as NGC 614. The object now identified as NGC 672 was discovered by John Herschel on 11 November 1827.

This galaxy is located at a distance of approximately 23.4 megalight-years from the Milky Way, where it forms an interacting pair with the irregular galaxy IC 1727. In the neutral hydrogen radio band, a tidal bridge is observed between the galaxies. NGC 672 appears to be the more massive of the two, and hence IC 1727 shows more distortion from the interaction. Together they form members of a combined group of galaxies that includes NGC 784.

The morphological classification of NGC 672 is SB(s)cd, which indicates this is a barred spiral galaxy (SB), with no ring structure around the central bar (s), and moderately to loosely-wound spiral arms. In the visual spectrum, the galaxy appears symmetrical with clearly defined spiral arms. It is gas-rich with an estimated mass of 38 billion times the mass of the Sun and a star formation rate of 0.3 M_{☉} yr^{−1}.
