= NGC 805 =

Lenticular galaxy in the constellation Triangulum

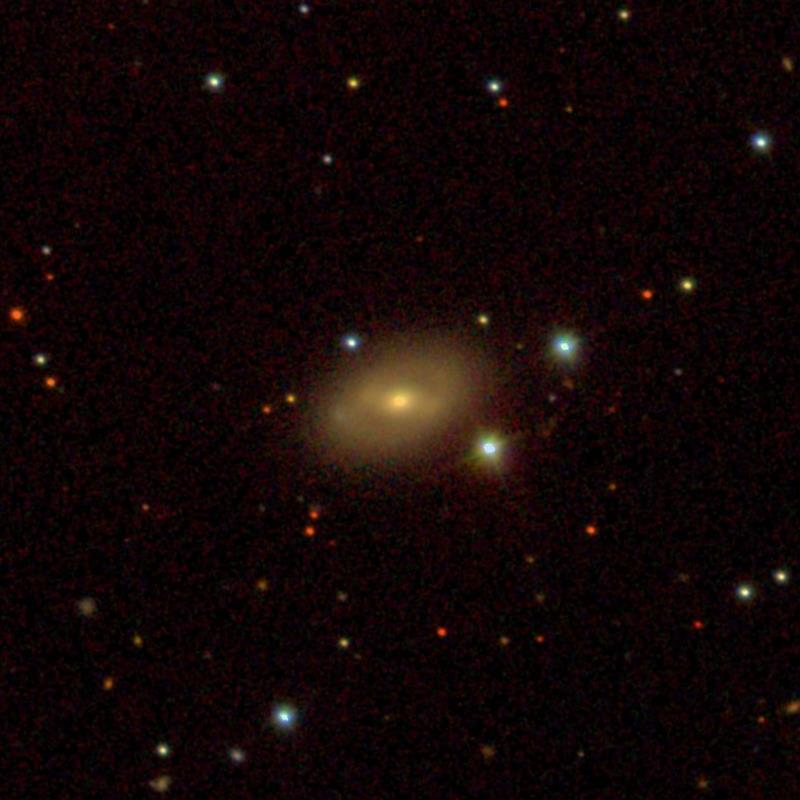
- NGC 805 (SDSS)

Observation data (J2000.0 epoch)
- Constellation: Triangulum
- Right ascension: 02^{h} 04^{m} 29.57^{s}
- Declination: +28° 48′ 44.37″
- Redshift: 0.015164
- Heliocentric radial velocity: 4546 ± 31 km/s
- Distance: 194 Mly
- Apparent magnitude (V): 14.30
- Apparent magnitude (B): 15.30

Characteristics
- Type: SB0
- Apparent size (V): 1.1 x 0.8

Other designations
- PGC 7899, MCG 5-5-50, UGC 1566

NGC 805 is a lenticular galaxy approximately 194 million light-years away from Earth in the constellation of Triangulum. It was discovered by German astronomer Heinrich Louis d'Arrest on September 26, 1864, with the 11-inch refractor at Copenhagen.

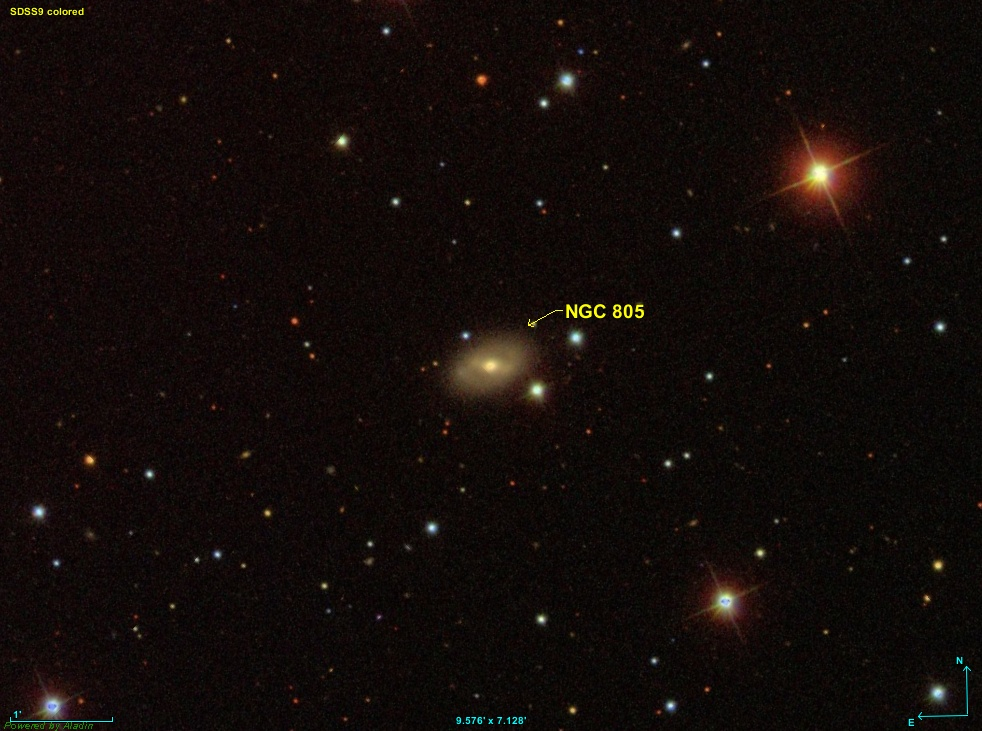
NGC 805 (SDSS)

== See also ==
- List of NGC objects (1–1000)
