= NGC 807 =

Galaxy in the constellation Triangulum

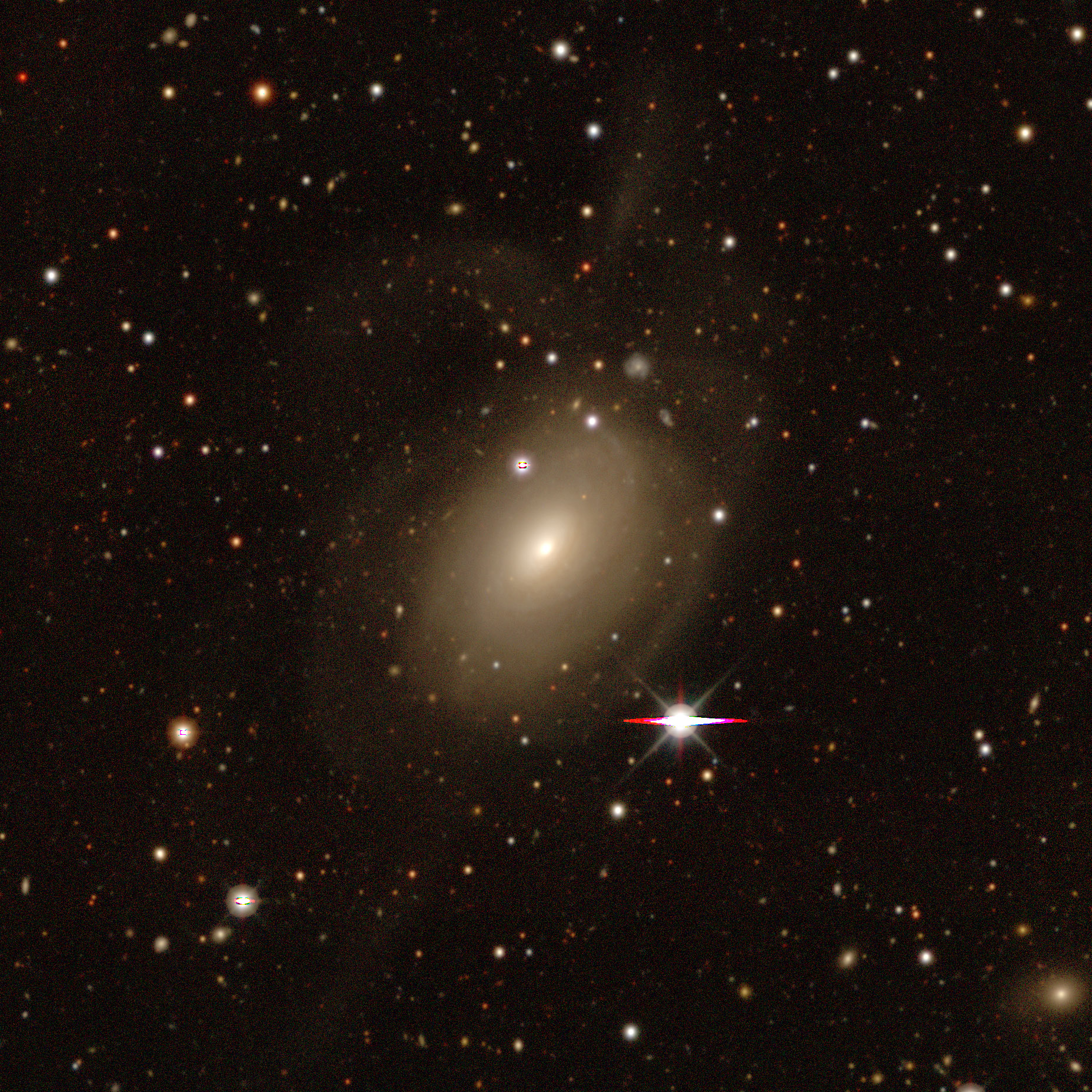
- legacy surveys image of NGC 807

Observation data (J2000 epoch)
- Constellation: Triangulum
- Right ascension: 02^{h} 04^{m} 55.6^{s}
- Declination: +28° 59′ 15″
- Heliocentric radial velocity: 4764 ± 12 km/s
- Galactocentric velocity: 4877 ± 13 km/s
- Distance: 196.18 ± 29.75 Mly (60.150 ± 9.122 Mpc)
- Apparent magnitude (B): 13.25

Characteristics
- Type: E

Other designations
- UGC 1571, MCG +05-06-001, PGC 7934

NGC 807 is an elliptical galaxy located in the constellation Triangulum. It is listed as part of the New General Catalogue (NGC) of astronomical objects. It was discovered by the astronomer William Herschel on September 11, 1784.

== Supernova ==
One supernova has been observed in NGC 807: SN 2023abnb (Type Ia, mag. 16.2) was discovered by the Zwicky Transient Facility on 27 December 2023.
