= NGC 860 =

Elliptical galaxy in the constellation Triangulum

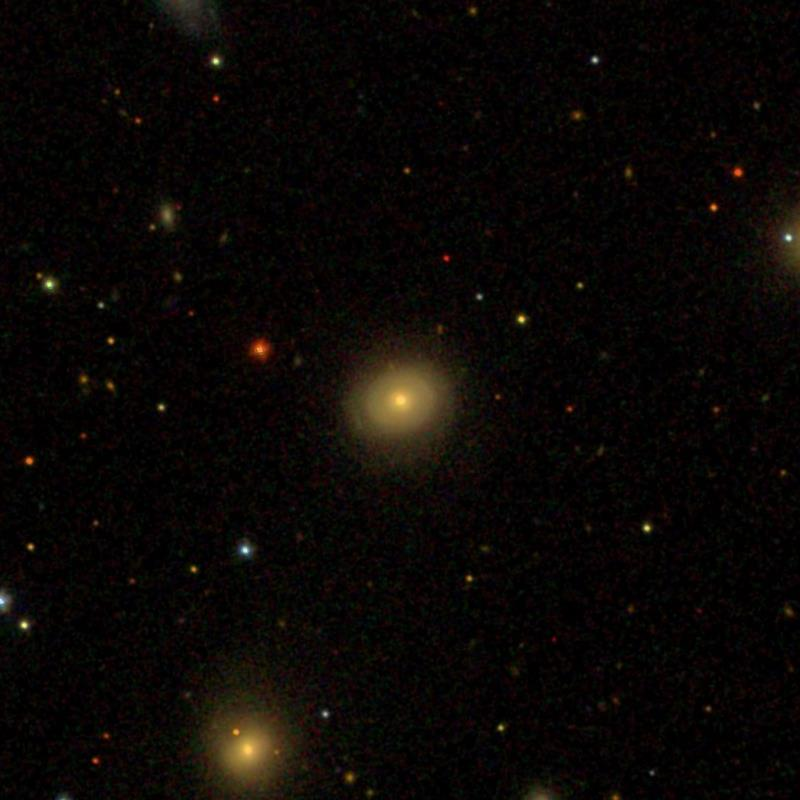
- SDSS image of NGC 860

Observation data (J2000 epoch)
- Constellation: Triangulum
- Right ascension: 02^{h} 15^{m} 00.169^{s}
- Declination: +30° 46′ 43.44″
- Redshift: 0.02943
- Heliocentric radial velocity: 8693 km/s
- Distance: 413.5 ± 29.0 Mly (126.77 ± 8.89 Mpc)
- Apparent magnitude (B): 15.1

Characteristics
- Type: E

Other designations
- IRAS F02121+3033, PGC 8606, CGCG 504-037

NGC 860 is an elliptical galaxy located in the constellation Triangulum. It is about 410 million light-years from the Milky Way. It was discovered by the French astronomer Édouard Stephan on 18 September 1871.

== See also ==
- List of NGC objects (1–1000)
