= NGC 861 =

Spiral galaxy in the constellation Triangulum

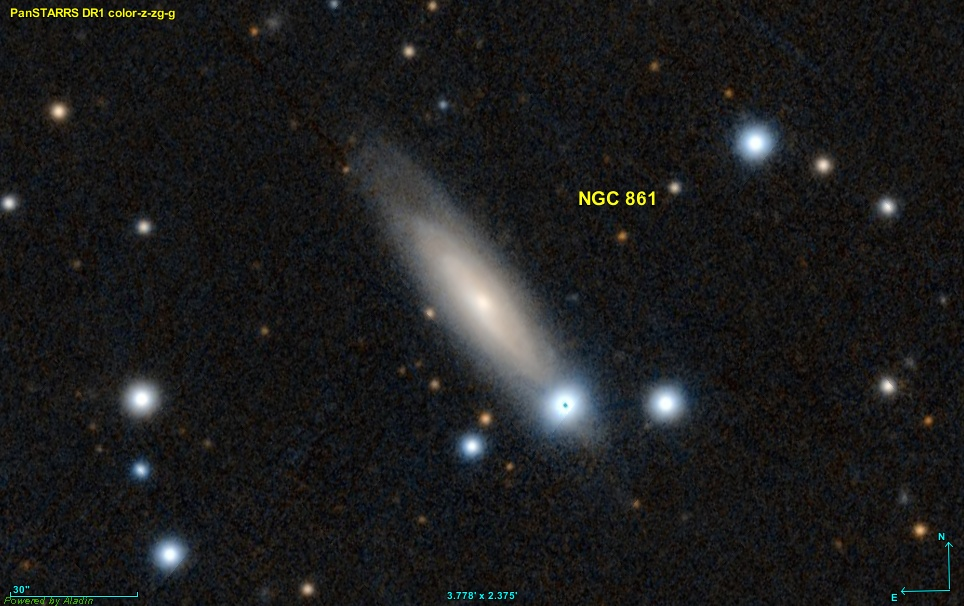
- Pan-STARRS image of NGC 861

Observation data (J2000 epoch)
- Constellation: Triangulum
- Right ascension: 02^{h} 15^{m} 51.146^{s}
- Declination: +35° 54′ 48.89″
- Redshift: 0.027249
- Heliocentric radial velocity: 8058 km/s
- Distance: 360.7 Mly (110.59 Mpc)
- Apparent magnitude (B): 14.8

Characteristics
- Type: Sb

Other designations
- UGC 1737, MCG +06-06-003, PGC 8652

NGC 861 is a spiral galaxy in the constellation Triangulum. It is estimated to be 360 million light-years from the Milky Way and has a diameter of approximately 165,000 light-years. The object was discovered on September 18, 1865 by Heinrich d'Arrest.

== See also ==
- List of NGC objects (1–1000)
