= V1149 Orionis =

Binary star in the constellation Orion

- Location of HD 37824 (circled)

Observation data Epoch J2000 Equinox J2000
- Constellation: Orion
- Right ascension: 05^{h} 41^{m} 26.78779^{s}
- Declination: +03° 46′ 40.9348″
- Apparent magnitude (V): 6.59

Characteristics
- Spectral type: K0III or K1III + late-F or G
- B−V color index: +1.14
- J−H color index: +0.721
- J−K color index: +0.875
- Variable type: RS CVn

Astrometry
Radial velocity (R_{v})	26.90 ± 0.3 km/s
Proper motion (μ)	RA: 34.517 mas/yr Dec.: 4.825 mas/yr
Parallax (π)	6.6357±0.0581 mas
Distance	492 ± 4 ly (151 ± 1 pc)
Absolute magnitude (M_{V})	0.68±0.37

Orbit
Primary	HD 37824 A
Companion	HD 37824 B
Period (P)	53.57465±0.00072 d
Semi-major axis (a)	19.518±0.083×10^{6} km (minimum)
Eccentricity (e)	0.0 (adopted)
Periastron epoch (T)	2448625.022±0.037

Details

HD 37824 A
Mass	1.5–2.5 M_{☉}
Radius	12.6±2.2 R_{☉}
Luminosity	67±23 L_{☉}
Metallicity [Fe/H]	0.0 dex
Rotation	54.1
Rotational velocity (v sin i)	14.9±1.0 km/s

Other designations
- V1149 Ori, AG+03° 687, BD+03° 1007, Gaia DR3 3224222985512259072, HD 37824, HIP 26795, SAO 113040, PPM 149320, TIC 199890794, TYC 123-713-1, GSC 00123-00713, 2MASS J05412678+0346410

Database references
SIMBAD	HD 37824

HD 37824 is a spectroscopic binary star system in the constellation of Orion. It has the variable-star designation V1149 Orionis (abbreviated to V1149 Ori). With an apparent magnitude of 6.59, it is near the limit for naked eye observation from Earth, faintly visible as an orange-hued dot of light under dark skies. It is located approximately 492 light-years (151 parsecs) distant according to Gaia DR3 parallax measurements, and is moving further away at a heliocentric radial velocity of 26.90 km/s.

== Stellar properties ==
HD 37824 is a single-lined spectroscopic binary, meaning only the light from the luminous primary can be observed in the system's spectra. The two stars orbit each other in a circular orbit (eccentricity 0.0) with a period of 53.57 days. The star features prominent starspots, which are known to display the flip-flop effect; other stars that show this effect include FK Comae Berenices and HD 181809.

The primary star (HD 37824 A) is a chromospherically active K-type giant star in the core helium burning phase. It has a radius of 12.6 R_{☉} and evolutionary models predict that its mass is 1.5–2.5 M_{☉}. It is radiating 67±23 times the luminosity of the Sun from its photosphere. The unseen secondary, B, is estimated to have a mass of 1.10 M_{☉} if the orbital inclination is 90°, or 0.95–1.27 M_{☉} with an inclination of 60°, which makes it likely to be a late-F-type or G-type main-sequence star.

== Observational history ==
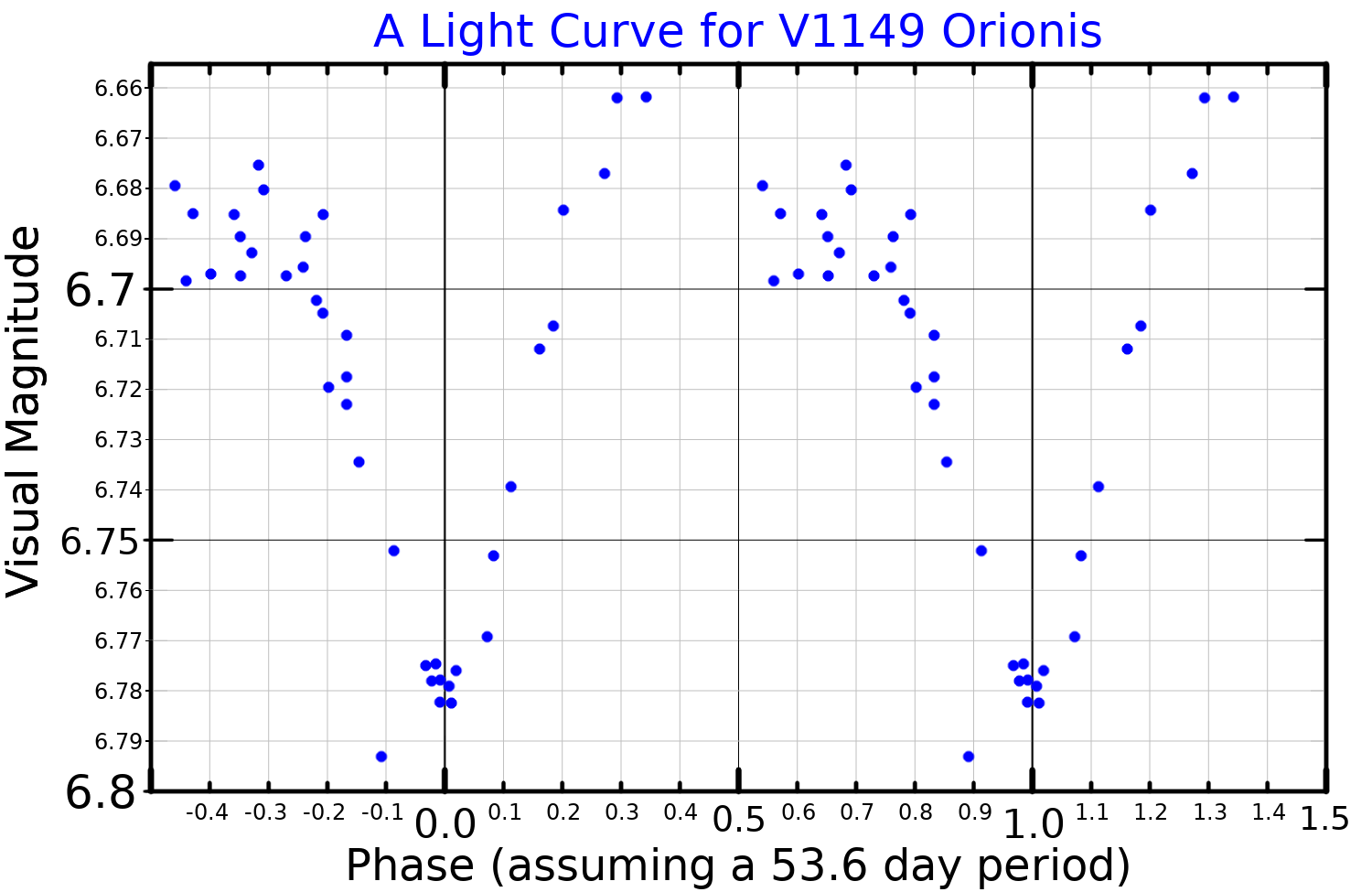
A visual band light curve for V1149 Orionis in February 1981, adapted from Hall et al.

In 1973, astronomers William P. Bidelman and Darrell Jack MacConnell reported the detection of Ca II H & K emission lines in the spectra of HD 37824. As such, Douglas S. Hall et al. suspected it to be a RS Canum Venaticorum variable. As expected, in 1983, the star was shown to vary in brightness by 0.11 magnitudes, with photometric and orbital periods of 52.6 and 53.6 days, respectively. It was given its variable star designation in 1985.

The starspots on the surface of the primary star, which are thought to cause the variability, were analyzed using photometric data taken between late 1978 and early 1990. The results were published in 1991, identifying six starspots, which each made the star dim by about 0.1 to 0.3 magnitudes and lasted for several years. The same study refined the orbital period to 53.58±0.02 days.

Observations in 1992 showed a large excess of Hα emission alongside strong Ca II H & K and Hε emission lines. A follow-up study in 1997 reported a lower but still strong Hα emission, as well as a clear emission line from singly ionized helium revealed by spectral subtraction. Additional observations in 2000 discovered high variability in the profile of the Hα line.

== See also ==
- XX Trianguli
