= NGC 740 =

Galaxy in the constellation Triangulum

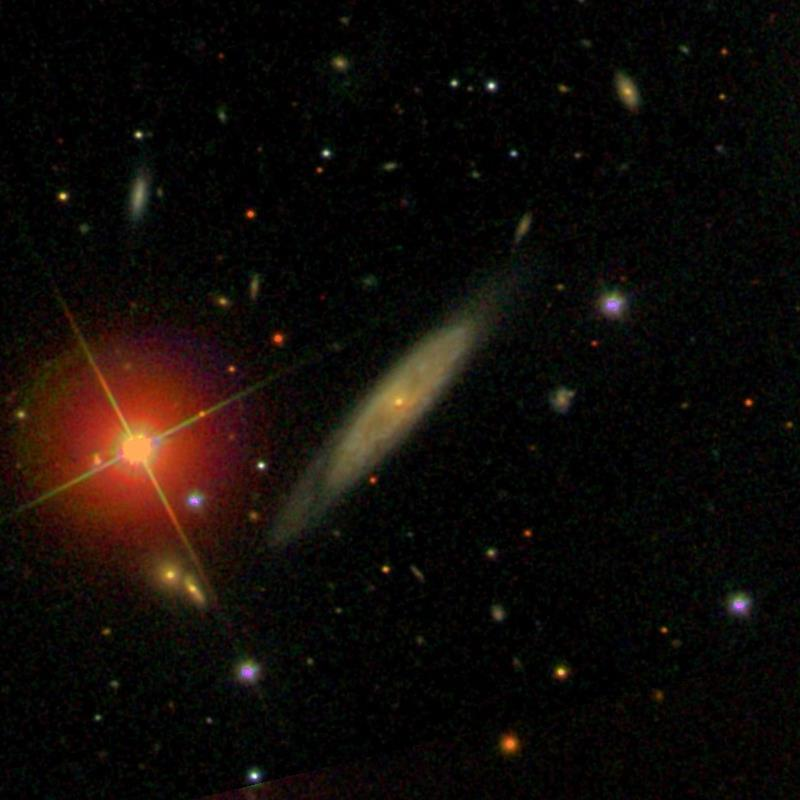
- NGC 740 imaged by the Sloan Digital Sky Survey

Observation data (J2000 epoch)
- Constellation: Triangulum
- Right ascension: 01^{h} 56^{m} 54.867^{s}
- Declination: +33° 00′ 54.63″
- Heliocentric radial velocity: 4,518 km/s
- Distance: 198.9 Mly (60.98 Mpc)
- Apparent magnitude (B): 14.9

Characteristics
- Type: SBb?
- Mass: 2.48×10^{12} M_{☉}
- Size: 1,100 kly
- Apparent size (V): 1.017′ × 0.264′

Other designations
- UGC 1421, MCG +05-05-031, PGC 7316

NGC 740 is a barred spiral galaxy located in the constellation Triangulum. It is estimated to be 210 million light-years from the Milky Way and has a diameter of about 85,000 light-years. It was discovered by the Irish engineer Bindon Stoney, an assistant to William Parsons.

NGC 740 is part of a galaxy group known as LGG 39, which has at least 3 members, NGC 736, NGC 740 and UGC 1422.
