= NGC 890 =

Galaxy in the constellation Triangulum

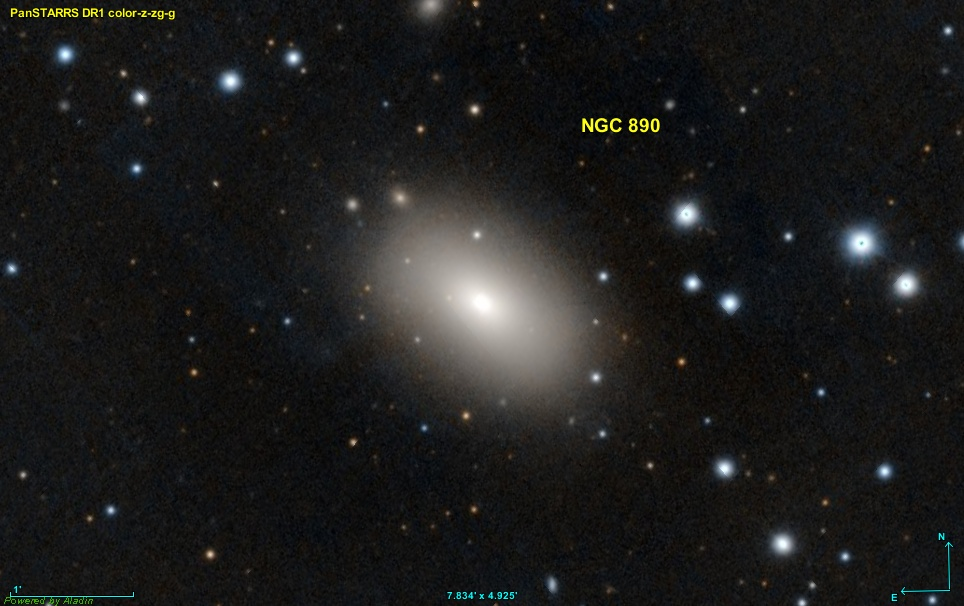
- Pan-STARRS image of NGC 890

Observation data (J2000 epoch)
- Constellation: Triangulum
- Right ascension: 02^{h} 22^{m} 01.008^{s}
- Declination: +33° 15′ 57.94″
- Redshift: 0.0138
- Heliocentric radial velocity: 4108 km/s
- Distance: 180.2 ± 12.7 Mly (55.24 ± 3.88 Mpc)
- Apparent magnitude (V): 11.05
- Apparent magnitude (B): 12.5
- Absolute magnitude (V): −21.7

Characteristics
- Type: SAB0^{−}(r)?

Other designations
- UGC 1823, MCG +05-06-030, PGC 8997

NGC 890 is a lenticular galaxy in the constellation Triangulum. It is estimated to be 180 million light-years from the Milky Way and has a diameter of approximately 130,000 ly. NGC 890 was discovered on September 13, 1784 by Wilhelm Herschel.

== See also ==
- List of NGC objects (1–1000)
