= NGC 736 =

Galaxy in the constellation Triangulum

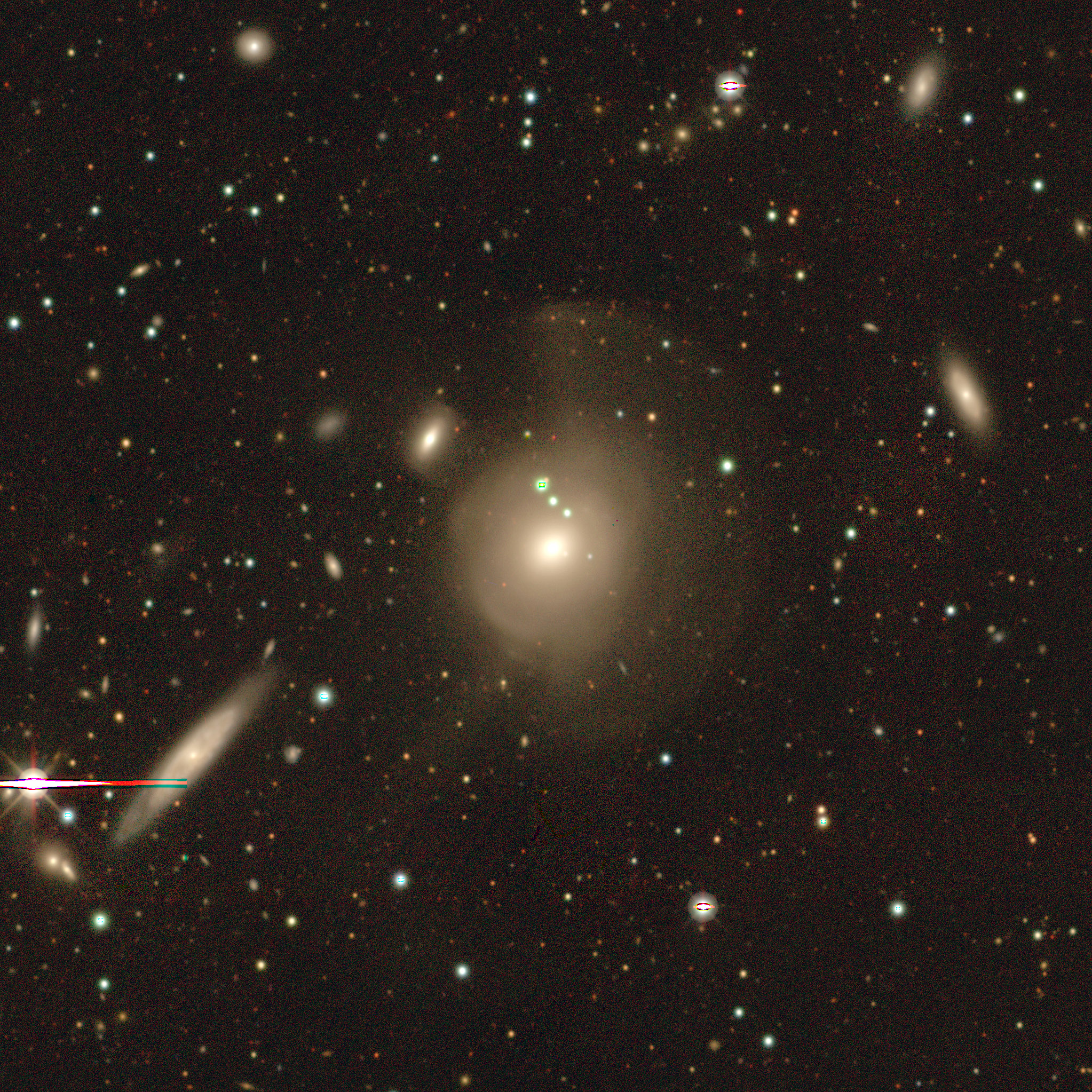
- legacy surveys image of NGC 736 (center), as well as the galaxies NGC 733, NGC 738 and NGC 740

Observation data (J2000 epoch)
- Constellation: Triangulum
- Right ascension: 01^{h} 56^{m} 40.871^{s}
- Declination: +33° 02′ 36.67″
- Redshift: 0.014567
- Heliocentric radial velocity: 4335 km/s
- Distance: 191.8 Mly (58.80 Mpc)
- Apparent magnitude (V): 12.13
- Apparent magnitude (B): 13.6
- Absolute magnitude (V): -21.6

Characteristics
- Type: E

Other designations
- UGC 1414, MCG +05-05-028, PGC 7289

NGC 736 is an elliptical galaxy in the constellation Triangulum. It is an estimated 200 million light years from the Milky Way and has a diameter of approximately 85,000 light years. NGC 736 was discovered on September 12, 1784 by the German-British astronomer William Herschel.

NGC 736 is part of a galaxy group known as LGG 39, which has at least 3 members, NGC 736, NGC 740 and UGC 1422.

== See also ==
- List of NGC objects (1–1000)
