= NGC 579 =

Galaxy in the constellation Triangulum

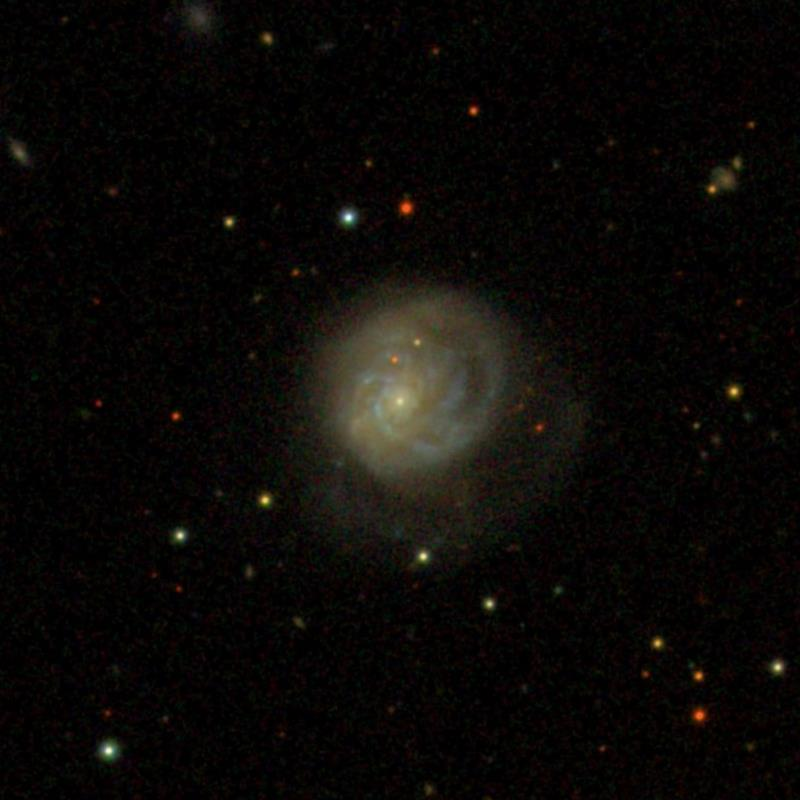
- NGC 579 imaged by SDSS

Observation data (J2000 epoch)
- Constellation: Triangulum
- Right ascension: 01^{h} 31^{m} 46.5375^{s}
- Declination: +33° 36′ 55.954″
- Redshift: 0.016655±0.0000130
- Heliocentric radial velocity: 4,993±4 km/s
- Distance: 226.9 ± 15.9 Mly (69.57 ± 4.88 Mpc)
- Group or cluster: NGC 507 Group (LGG 26)
- Apparent magnitude (V): 13.9

Characteristics
- Type: Scd
- Size: ~119,500 ly (36.65 kpc) (estimated)
- Apparent size (V): 1.1′ × 1.0′

Other designations
- IRAS 01289+3321, 2MASX J01314651+3336560, UGC 1089, MCG +05-04-064, PGC 5691, CGCG 502-103

NGC 579 is a spiral galaxy in the constellation of Triangulum. Its velocity with respect to the cosmic microwave background is 4,717±20 km/s, which corresponds to a Hubble distance of 226.9 ± 15.9 Mly (69.57 ± 4.88 Mpc). It was discovered by British astronomer John Herschel on 22 November 1827.

NGC 579 has a possible active galactic nucleus, i.e. it has a compact region at the center of a galaxy that emits a significant amount of energy across the electromagnetic spectrum, with characteristics indicating that this luminosity is not produced by the stars.

== NGC 507 group ==
NGC 579 is a member of the NGC 507 group (also known as LGG 26). This large group contains 42 galaxies, of which 21 are in the NGC catalogue, and 5 are in the IC catalogue.

== Supernova ==
One supernova has been observed in NGC 579:

- SN 2007pk (Type IIn, mag. 17.0) was discovered by the Lick Observatory Supernova Search (LOSS) on 10 November 2007.

== See also ==
- List of NGC objects (1–1000)
