= B2 0206+35 =

Radio galaxy in the constellation of Triangulum

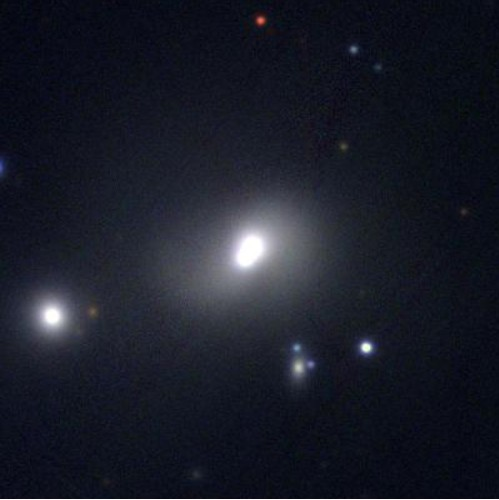
- The radio galaxy B2 0206+35.

Observation data (J2000 epoch)
- Constellation: Triangulum
- Right ascension: 02^{h} 09^{m} 38.589^{s}
- Declination: +35° 47′ 50.34″
- Redshift: 0.036572
- Heliocentric radial velocity: 10,964 km/s
- Distance: 534 Mly
- Apparent magnitude (V): 13.0
- Apparent magnitude (B): 14.9

Characteristics
- Type: FR I
- Notable features: Radio galaxy

Other designations
- UGC 1651, PGC 8249, OHIO D 311, 4C 35.03, ZW V 191, BWE 0206+3533, Cul 0206+355

B2 0206+35 known as UGC 1651 or 4C 35.03, is a low-luminosity Fanaroff Riley class I radio galaxy located in the constellation of Triangulum. Its redshift is (z) 0.037 and it is a member of a galaxy cluster, Zwicky 0216.0+3625.

== Description ==
B2 0206+35 is classified as an elliptical galaxy or alternatively, a dumbbell galaxy. It is described as having a distorted appearance with a tidal tail and a dust lane running through its center, indicating the galaxy is interacting with a nearby galaxy located 31 kiloparsecs away at a position angle of 110°.

The galaxy has two-sided radio jets found emerging straight out from the nucleus. They measure 40 kiloparsecs (kpc) northwest to southeast, with observations showing they are embedded in a radio emission halo of low surface brightness. Very Large Array (VLA) resolved imaging shows the galaxy has a main jet and a counter jet. The main jet is centrally peaked, narrow with a bright base while the counter jet is wider with a limb-brighten structure, found to be the brightest between 2.5 and 6 arcseconds from the nucleus.

The nucleus of the galaxy itself is described as a bright core with a flat spectrum. In addition, the galaxy has radio lobes that are depicted as overlapping and circular in cross-section. One of the lobes located northwest has a circular edge found projecting beyond the emission boundaries, while the other lobe is located within the outer boundary of the source.

Radio mapping by the VLA at 5 GHz, showed both lobes are polarized. Based on results, the northwest lobe has a mean fractional polarization percentage of 23.2% while the mean fractional polarization of the southeast lobe is 27.5%. Because of the difference between frequencies, this might be caused by Faraday depolarization. The polarization in the core is estimated to be either 5.6% or 5.3% according to Capetti who measured it at 1.4 GHz frequencies. A magnetic field surrounds the galaxy along the line of sight, being associated with the largest amplitude band located in the lobe's outer parts.
