= NGC 953 =

Elliptical galaxy in the constellation Triangulum

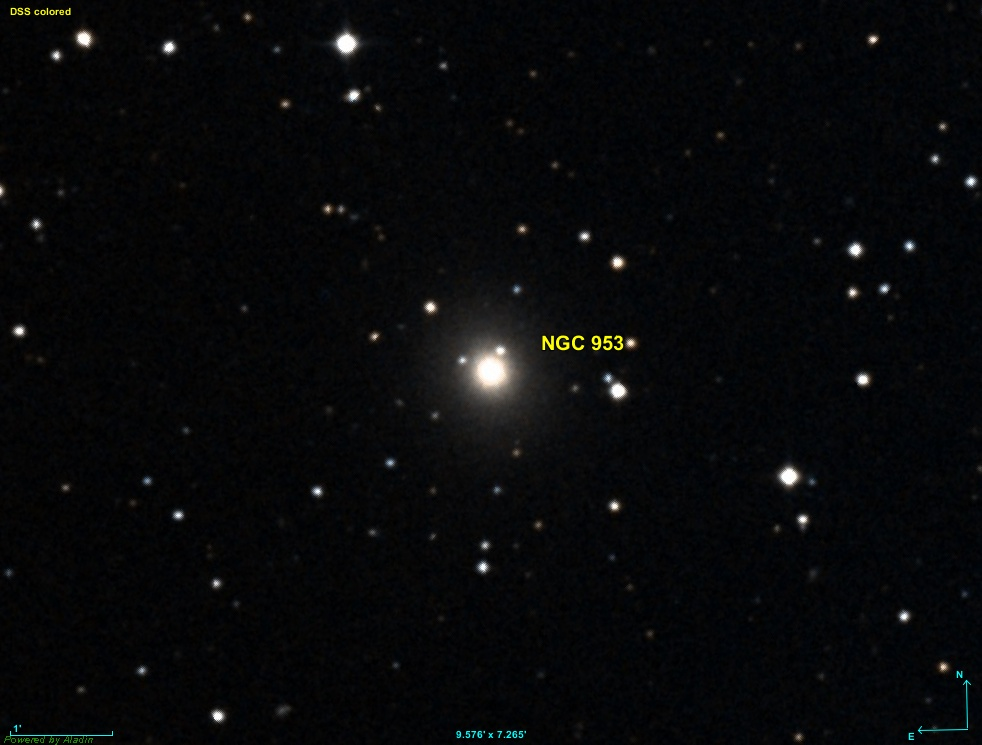

Observation data (J2000 epoch)
- Constellation: Triangulum
- Right ascension: 02^{h} 31^{m} 09.7944^{s}
- Declination: +29° 35′ 19.632″
- Redshift: 0.015758±0.000087
- Heliocentric radial velocity: 4724 ± 26 km/s
- Distance: 216.2 ± 15.3 Mly (66.30 ± 4.68 Mpc)
- Apparent magnitude (V): 14.5

Characteristics
- Type: E
- Size: ~96,500 ly (29.59 kpc) (estimated)
- Apparent size (V): 1.5′ × 1.5′

Other designations
- UGC 1991, MCG +05-07-001, PGC 9586, CGCG 504-104

NGC 953 is an elliptical galaxy in the constellation Triangulum. It has an apparent magnitude of 14.5. It was discovered by German astronomer Heinrich Louis d'Arrest on September 26, 1865.
