= NGC 970 =

Pair of interacting galaxies in the constellation Triangulum

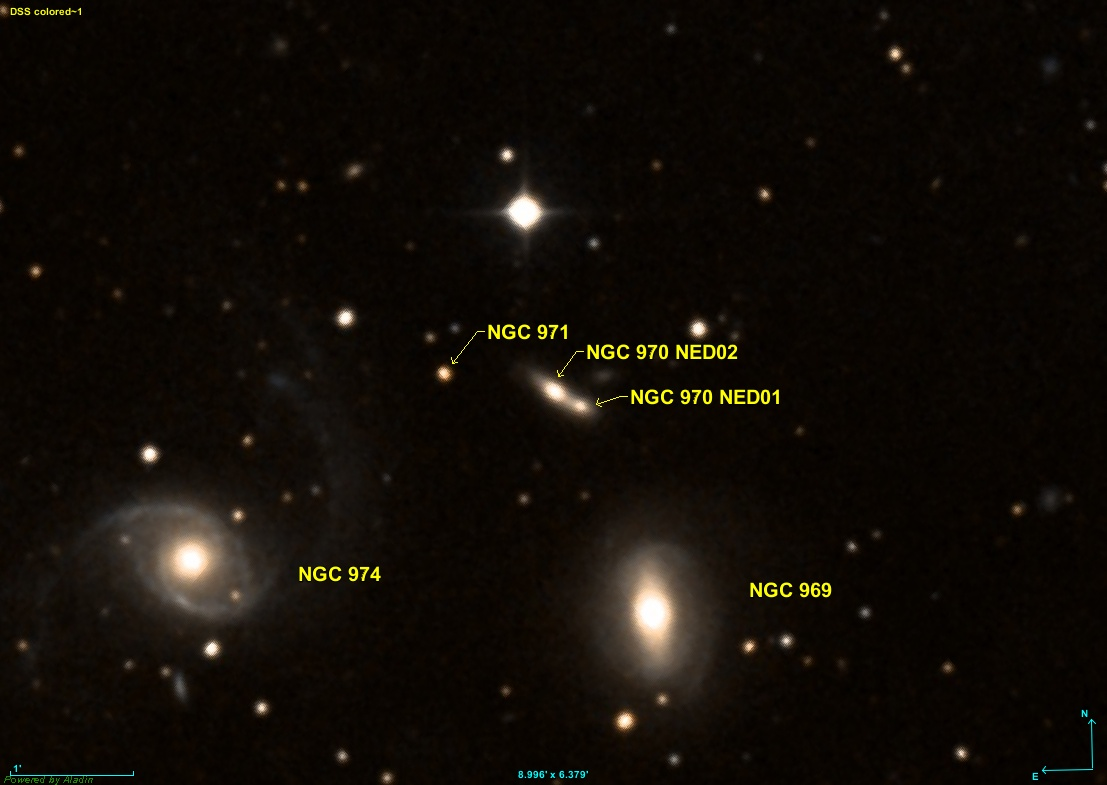
- DSS image of NGC 970

Observation data (J2000 epoch)
- Constellation: Triangulum
- Right ascension: 02^{h} 34^{m} 11.69897^{s}
- Declination: +32° 58′ 38.3137″
- Redshift: 0.03270
- Heliocentric radial velocity: 9642 km/s
- Distance: 471.4 Mly (144.54 Mpc) (Note: From a distance modulus μ of 35.80 ± 0.11 magnitudes.)
- Apparent magnitude (B): 15.66

Characteristics
- Type: S:

Other designations
- MCG +05-07-009, PGC 9786

NGC 970 is an interacting galaxy pair in the constellation Triangulum. It is estimated to be 471 million light-years from the Milky Way and has a diameter of approximately 100,000 ly. The object was discovered on September 14, 1850, by Bindon Blood Stoney.

== See also ==
- List of NGC objects (1–1000)
