= HD 10390 =

B-type main-sequence star; Triangulum

- Location of HD 10390 on the map (circled)

Observation data Epoch J2000.0 Equinox J2000.0 (ICRS)
- Constellation: Triangulum
- Right ascension: 01^{h} 42^{m} 03.48964^{s}
- Declination: +35° 14′ 44.5389″
- Apparent magnitude (V): 5.64

Characteristics
- Evolutionary stage: main sequence star
- Spectral type: B9 IV-V or B9 V
- U−B color index: −0.20
- B−V color index: −0.07

Astrometry
Radial velocity (R_{v})	−1.9±2.0 km/s
Proper motion (μ)	RA: +48.763 mas/yr Dec.: −25.418 mas/yr
Parallax (π)	11.1882±0.164 mas
Distance	292 ± 4 ly (89 ± 1 pc)
Absolute magnitude (M_{V})	+1.00

Details
Mass	2.62 M_{☉}
Radius	2.14±0.11 R_{☉}
Luminosity	51.5^{+2.4}_{−2.3} L_{☉}
Surface gravity (log g)	4.23^{+0.08}_{−0.04} cgs
Temperature	11,076±139 K
Metallicity [Fe/H]	−0.20 dex
Rotational velocity (v sin i)	45 km/s
Age	50^{+81}_{−31} Myr

Other designations
- 6 H. Trianguli, AG+34°163, BD+34°297, FK5 1047, GC 2064, HD 10390, HIP 7943, HR 490, SAO 54912, TIC 61524043

Database references
SIMBAD	data

HD 10390 (HR 490; 6 H. Trinaguli) is a solitary star located in the northern constellation Triangulum. It is faintly visible to the naked eye as a bluish-white hued point of light with an apparent magnitude of 5.64. The object is located relatively close at a distance of 292 light-years based on Gaia DR3 parallax measurements and it is drifting closer with a heliocentric radial velocity of −1.9 km/s. At its current distance, HD 10390's brightness is diminished by an interstellar extinction of only five-hundredths of a magnitude and it has an absolute magnitude of +1.00.

HD 10390 has a stellar classification of B9 IV-V, indicating that it is a slightly evolved B-type star with a luminosity class intermediate between a subgiant and a main sequence star. Osawa (1959) gave a class of B9 V, instead indicating that it is an ordinary B-type main-sequence star that is generating energy via hydrogen fusion at its core. It has 2.62 times the mass of the Sun and 2.14 times the radius of the Sun. It radiates 51.5 times the luminosity of the Sun from its photosphere at an effective temperature of 11,076 K. HD 10390 is metal defecient with an iron abundance of [Fe/H] = −0.2 or 63.1% of the Sun's and it spins modestly with a projected rotational velocity of 45 km/s, well below its breakup velocity of 355 km/s. Despite the first classification, HD 10390 has only completed 16.8% of its main sequence lifetime at the age of approximately 50 million years.
