= HD 11007 =

F-type main-sequence star in Triangulum

- Location of HD 11007 on the map (circled)

Observation data Epoch J2000.0 Equinox ICRS
- Constellation: Triangulum
- Right ascension: 01^{h} 48^{m} 41.56269^{s}
- Declination: +32° 41′ 24.7521″
- Apparent magnitude (V): 5.81

Characteristics
- Spectral type: F8 V
- U−B color index: −0.03
- B−V color index: +0.54

Astrometry
Radial velocity (R_{v})	−24.4±0.3 km/s
Proper motion (μ)	RA: −167.798 mas/yr Dec.: +296.869 mas/yr
Parallax (π)	36.0886±0.0529 mas
Distance	90.4 ± 0.1 ly (27.71 ± 0.04 pc)
Absolute magnitude (M_{V})	+3.56

Details
Mass	1.11 M_{☉}
Radius	1.67±0.04 R_{☉}
Luminosity	3.228^{+0.011}_{−0.010} L_{☉}
Surface gravity (log g)	4.03±0.03 cgs
Temperature	6,060±64 K
Metallicity [Fe/H]	−0.20 dex
Rotational velocity (v sin i)	5±3 km/s
Age	6.6±0.5 Gyr

Other designations
- AG+32°162, BD+31°316, FK5 2120, GC 2195, HD 11007, HIP 8433, HR 523, SAO 54994, LTT 10624, TIC 20931913

Database references
SIMBAD	data

HD 11007 (LTT 10624; HR 523) is a probable astrometric binary located in the northern constellation Triangulum. The primary is faintly visible to the naked eye as a whitish-yellow-hued star with an apparent magnitude of 5.81. The system is located relatively close at a distance of 90.4 light-years based on Gaia DR3 parallax measurements and it is drifting closer with a heliocentric radial velocity of −24.4 km/s. At its current distance, HD 11007's brightness is diminished by an interstellar extinction of 0.09 magnitudes and it has an absolute magnitude of +3.56. It is moving relatively fast across the celestial sphere, having a high proper motion of 341 mas/yr.

The primary has a stellar classification of F8 V, indicating that it is an ordinary F-type main-sequence star that is generating energy via hydrogen fusion at its core. However, it is slightly evolved, being 1.62 magnitudes above the zero age main sequence. It has 111% the mass of the Sun and a slightly enlarged radius 1.67 times that of the Sun. It is slightly over luminous for its class, radiating 3.23 times the luminosity of the Sun from its photosphere at an effective temperature of 6,060 K. HD 11007 A is metal deficient with an iron abundance that is 63.1% solar and it spins modestly with a somewhat constrained projected rotational velocity of approximately 5 km/s. The system is estimated to be 6.6 billion years old; it was suspected to be part of the thick disk population but is now considered to be one of the older members of the thin disk population.
