= 15 Trianguli =

Star in the constellation Triangulum

- Location of 15 Trianguli (circled)

Observation data Epoch J2000.0 Equinox ICRS
- Constellation: Triangulum
- Right ascension: 02^{h} 35^{m} 46.821^{s}
- Declination: +34° 41′ 15.18″
- Apparent magnitude (V): 5.396

Characteristics
- Evolutionary stage: AGB
- Spectral type: M3 III
- Variable type: suspected

Astrometry
Radial velocity (R_{v})	−8.646±2.407 km/s
Proper motion (μ)	RA: 26.689±0.361 mas/yr Dec.: −48.894±0.233 mas/yr
Parallax (π)	4.8075±0.2721 mas
Distance	680 ± 40 ly (210 ± 10 pc)

Details
Mass	1.689±0.084 M_{☉}
Radius	118.453±5.923 R_{☉}
Luminosity	1,668 L_{☉}
Surface gravity (log g)	0.489 cgs
Temperature	3,572 K
Metallicity [Fe/H]	0.08 dex

Other designations
- 15 Trianguli, NSV 866, AG+34°259, BD+34°469, GC 3103, HD 16058, HIP 12086, HR 750, SAO 55687

Database references
SIMBAD	data

15 Trianguli is a suspected variable star located in the northern constellation Triangulum, with an apparent magnitude of 5.4 making it faintly visible to the naked eye under ideal conditions, although it is suspected of being an irregular variable with a range of 0.14 magnitudes. The star is situated about 480 light years away but is approaching with a heliocentric radial velocity of −8.646 km/s.

15 Trianguli has a stellar classification of M3 III. It has 1.7 times the mass of the Sun and 118 times the radius of the Sun. It has an effective temperature of 3,572 K and shines at 1,668 times the luminosity of the Sun from its photosphere, giving it an orange glow. It is an asymptotic giant branch star, which means it is fusing hydrogen and helium in separate shells around an inert carbon core.
