= 5 Trianguli =

Star in the constellation Triangulum

- Location of 5 Trianguli (circled)

Observation data Epoch J2000 Equinox J2000
- Constellation: Triangulum
- Right ascension: 02^{h} 11^{m} 25.02^{s}
- Declination: +31° 31′ 35.0″
- Apparent magnitude (V): 6.23±0.01

Characteristics
- Spectral type: A0 Vm
- U−B color index: +0.11
- B−V color index: +0.12

Astrometry
Radial velocity (R_{v})	7.7±1.5 km/s
Proper motion (μ)	RA: +35.429 mas/yr Dec.: −10.785 mas/yr
Parallax (π)	8.1779±0.0862 mas
Distance	399 ± 4 ly (122 ± 1 pc)
Absolute magnitude (M_{V})	+1.07

Details
Mass	2.22±0.41 M_{☉}
Radius	2.96±0.36 R_{☉}
Luminosity	48.2±1.2 L_{☉}
Surface gravity (log g)	3.84±0.31 cgs
Temperature	8,836 K
Metallicity [Fe/H]	−0.17 dex
Rotational velocity (v sin i)	15±10 km/s

Other designations
- 5 Trianguli, BD+30 347, HD 13372, HIP 10220, HR 634, SAO 55338

Database references
SIMBAD	data

5 Trianguli is a solitary star located in the northern constellation Triangulum. With an apparent magnitude of 6.23, it’s barely visible to the naked eye under ideal conditions. The star is located 399 light years away from the Solar System, but is drifting away with a radial velocity of 7.7 km/s.

5 Trianguli has a classification of A0 Vm, which states it’s an A-type main-sequence star with unusually strong metallic lines. It has 2.22 times the mass of the Sun and 2.96 times the radius of the Sun. 5 Trianguli radiates at 48 solar luminosities from its photosphere at an effective temperature of 8,836 kelvin, which gives it a white-hue of an A-type star. It has a low projected rotational velocity of 15 km/s, common for Am stars.
