= HD 11928 =

Suspected variable star in Triangulum

- Location of HD 11928 on the map (circled)

Observation data Epoch J2000.0 Equinox ICRS
- Constellation: Triangulum
- Right ascension: 01^{h} 57^{m} 43.74417^{s}
- Declination: +27° 48′ 15.7579″
- Apparent magnitude (V): 5.84 - 5.85

Characteristics
- Evolutionary stage: AGB
- Spectral type: M2 III
- B−V color index: +1.60
- Variable type: suspected

Astrometry
| Radial velocity (R_{v}) | −1.93±0.22 km/s |
| Proper motion (μ) | RA: +12.974 mas/yr Dec.: −60.043 mas/yr |
| Parallax (π) | 6.1432±0.1953 mas |
| Distance | 530 ± 20 ly (163 ± 5 pc) |
| Absolute magnitude (M_{V}) | +0.11 |

Details
| Radius | 52.68 R_{☉} |
| Luminosity | 485±17 L_{☉} |
| Surface gravity (log g) | 1.024 cgs |
| Temperature | 3,656±72 K |

Other designations
- NSV 15408, AG+27°211, BD+27°310, GC 2357, HD 11928, HIP 9132, HR 564, SAO 75048

Database references
| SIMBAD | data |

HD 11928 (HR 564; NSV 15408) is a solitary star located in the northern constellation of Triangulum. It is faintly visible to the naked eye as a red-hued point of light with an apparent magnitude of 5.85. Gaia DR3 parallax measurements imply a distance of 530 light-years and it is drifting closer with a heliocentric radial velocity of −1.93 km/s. At its current distance, HD 11928's brightness is diminished by an interstellar extinction of 0.13 magnitudes and it has an absolute magnitude of +0.11.

HD 11928 has a stellar classification of M2 III, indicating that is an evolved M-type giant star. It is currently an asymptotic giant branch star that is generating energy via the fusion of hydrogen and helium shells around an inert carbon core. At present it has expanded to 52.68 times the radius of the Sun and it radiates 485 times the luminosity of the Sun from its photosphere at an effective temperature of 3,656 K.

In 1997, the Hipparcos satellite observed that the star varied from 5.89 to 5.93 in the Hipparcos passband. Further observations from Koen & Eyer reveal that HD 11928 flucates between 5.84 and 5.85 in the visual passband within 50.7 days. As of 2004 however, its variability has not been confirmed, but it is still suspected to be variable.
