= 11 Trianguli =

Star in the constellation Triangulum

- Location of 11 Trianguli (circled)

Observation data Epoch J2000.0 Equinox ICRS
- Constellation: Triangulum
- Right ascension: 02^{h} 27^{m} 27.771^{s}
- Declination: +31° 48′ 04.61″
- Apparent magnitude (V): 5.55

Characteristics
- Evolutionary stage: horizontal branch
- Spectral type: K1 III
- B−V color index: +1.1

Astrometry
Radial velocity (R_{v})	−41.614±0.163 km/s
Proper motion (μ)	RA: −24.331 mas/yr Dec.: −27.845 mas/yr
Parallax (π)	11.6240±0.1293 mas
Distance	281 ± 3 ly (86.0 ± 1.0 pc)
Absolute magnitude (M_{V})	0.836

Details
Mass	2.446±0.122 M_{☉}
Radius	12.055±0.603 R_{☉}
Luminosity	54.6±3.8 L_{☉}
Surface gravity (log g)	2.2 cgs
Temperature	4,572 K
Metallicity [Fe/H]	−0.19 dex
Age	6.3+2.8 −1.4 Gyr

Other designations
- 11 Trianguli, AG+31° 231, BD+31°427, GC 2943, HD 15176, HIP 11432, HR 712, SAO 55570

Database references
SIMBAD	data

11 Trianguli is a solitary star located in the northern constellation Triangulum, with an apparent magnitude of 5.55. The star is situated 281 light years away but is approaching with a heliocentric radial velocity of −41.614 km/s. It is probably on the horizontal branch fusing helium in its core, and is calculated to be about 6.3 Gyr old. It has a stellar classification of K1 III. It has 2.446 times the mass of the Sun and 12.055 times the radius of the Sun. It shines at 54.6 times the luminosity of the Sun from its photosphere at an effective temperature of 4,572 K.

It was once designated d Trianguli by John Flamsteed and was included in his Atlas Coelestis, but the designation is now dropped.
