= R Trianguli =

M-type giant star

- Location of R Trianguli (circled)

Observation data Epoch J2000 Equinox ICRS
- Constellation: Triangulum
- Right ascension: 02^{h} 37^{m} 02.340^{s}
- Declination: +34° 15′ 51.34″
- Apparent magnitude (V): 5.4–12.6

Characteristics
- Spectral type: M3.5-8IIIe
- Apparent magnitude (B): 8.524±0.018
- Apparent magnitude (G): 6.699±0.055
- Apparent magnitude (R): 8.24
- Apparent magnitude (J): 2.23±0.27
- Apparent magnitude (H): 1.36±0.22
- Apparent magnitude (K): 1.05±0.21
- Variable type: Mira

Astrometry
Radial velocity (R_{v})	67.52±0.88 km/s
Proper motion (μ)	RA: +34.272 mas/yr Dec.: −10.683 mas/yr
Parallax (π)	2.4334±0.2487 mas
Distance	approx. 1,300 ly (approx. 410 pc)

Details
Mass	1.71 M_{☉}
Radius	196±41 R_{☉}
Luminosity	1,784 L_{☉}
Surface gravity (log g)	−0.09 cgs
Temperature	3184±120 K

Other designations
- R Tri, HR 758, HD 16210, HIP 12193, 2MASS J02370234+3415513, Gaia DR2 134874621777526400, Gaia DR3 134874621778128896

Database references
SIMBAD	data

R Trianguli (abbreviated as R Tri) is a short-period oxygen-rich Mira variable in Triangulum with a period of 266.9 days, discovered by T. H. E. C. Espin in 1890. When it is near its maximum brightness, it is faintly visible to the naked eye under excellent observing conditions.

The star is losing about 1.1×10^{−7} M_{☉}/yr, close to average for a short-period Mira variable. While most short-period Mira variables reside in the Galactic halo, R Trianguli is a member of the thick disk, and its proper motion is fairly high for its distance. Its angular diameter in the K band was measured in 2002 to be, on average, 5.22±0.30 mas, with a shape suggesting that there is an optically thin disk structure surrounding the star.

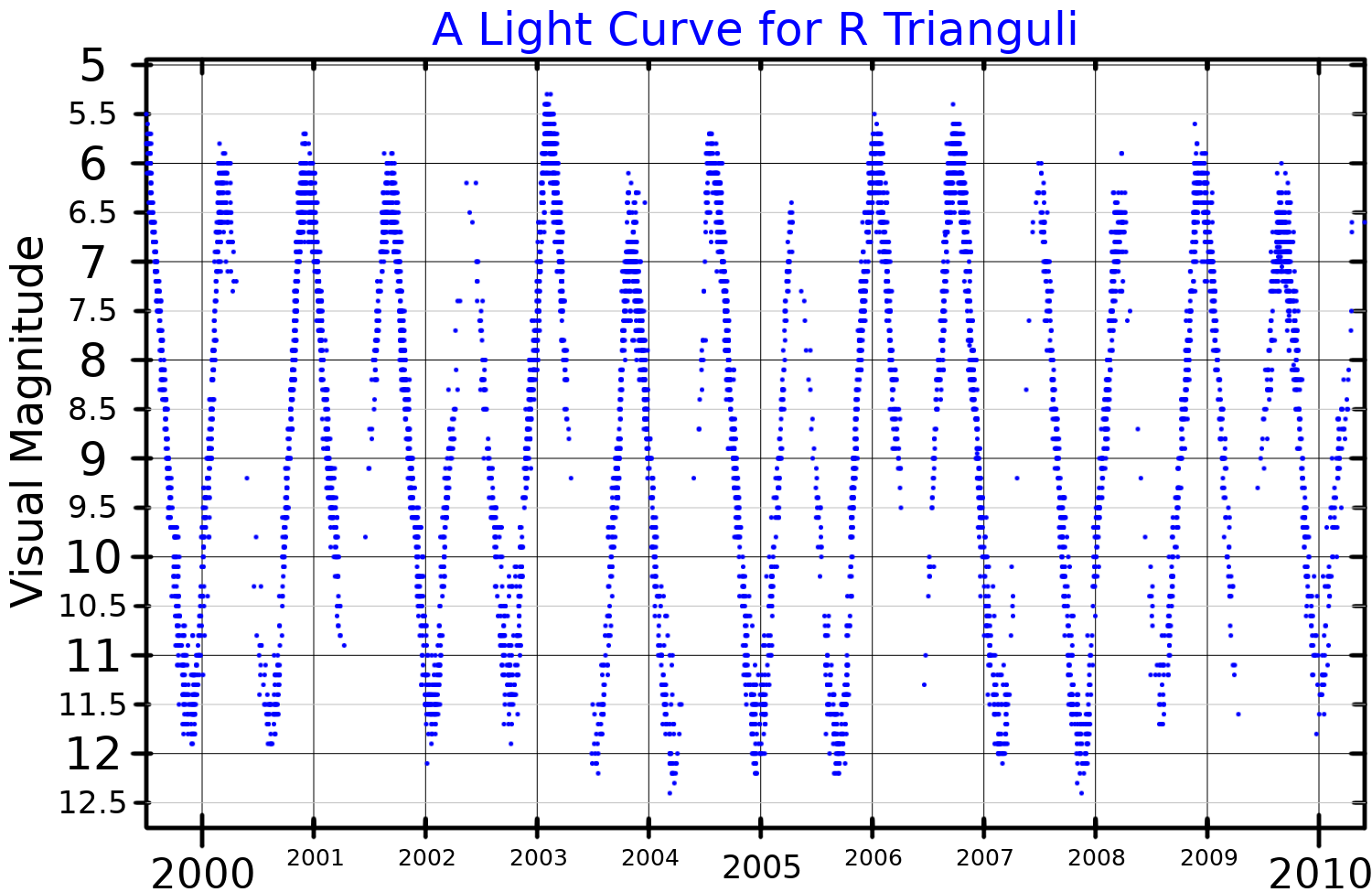
A visual band light curve for R Trianguli, plotted from AAVSO data
