= Epsilon Trianguli =

Binary star in the constellation Triangulum

ε Trianguli
- Location of ε Trianguli (circled)

Observation data Epoch J2000.0 Equinox ICRS
- Constellation: Triangulum
- Right ascension: 02^{h} 02^{m} 57.95579^{s}
- Declination: +33° 17′ 02.8813″
- Apparent magnitude (V): +5.50

Characteristics
- Evolutionary stage: main sequence
- Spectral type: A2 V
- U−B color index: +0.06
- B−V color index: +0.03

Astrometry
Radial velocity (R_{v})	3.3 km/s
Proper motion (μ)	RA: −15.97 mas/yr Dec.: −7.22 mas/yr
Parallax (π)	8.33±0.34 mas
Distance	390 ± 20 ly (120 ± 5 pc)
Absolute magnitude (M_{V})	+0.11

Details
Mass	2.75±0.05 M_{☉}
Radius	3.28 R_{☉}
Luminosity	93 L_{☉}
Surface gravity (log g)	3.76 cgs
Temperature	10,000 K
Rotational velocity (v sin i)	107 km/s
Age	600 Myr

Other designations
- ε Tri, 3 Tri, BD+32°369, HD 12471, HIP 9570, HR 599, SAO 55218

Database references
SIMBAD	data

Epsilon Trianguli, Latinized from ε Trianguli, is a binary star system in the northern constellation of Triangulum. Based upon measurement of its trigonometric parallax, it is approximately 390 light years from Earth.

The primary component is an A-type main sequence star with a stellar classification of A2 V, an apparent magnitude of +5.50 and an estimated age of 600 million years. It has 2.75 times the mass of the Sun and is spinning with a projected rotational velocity of 107 km/s. The radius of this star is more than three times the radius of the Sun, and the photosphere has an effective temperature of about 10,000. The secondary component has an apparent magnitude of 11.4 and is separated from the primary by an angle of 3.9 arcseconds.

An excess emission of infrared radiation suggests the presence of a dusty disk in orbit about the primary. This disk has a mean radius of 105 AU, or 105 times the separation of the Earth from the Sun, and is radiating at a temperature of 85 K.

Epsilon Triangulum is a probable member of the Ursa Major Moving Group of stars that share a common motion through space. The space velocity components of Epsilon Trianguli are [U, V, W] = [+11.8, +11.4, –3.8] km/s.
