= HD 13189 =

Orange-hued star in the constellation Triangulum

Observation data Epoch J2000.0 Equinox ICRS
- Constellation: Triangulum
- Right ascension: 02^{h} 09^{m} 40.1723^{s}
- Declination: +32° 18′ 59.161″
- Apparent magnitude (V): +7.57

Characteristics
- Spectral type: K1II-III
- B−V color index: 1.465±0.016

Astrometry
Radial velocity (R_{v})	25.39 km/s
Proper motion (μ)	RA: 2.306±0.024 mas/yr Dec.: 4.935±0.022 mas/yr
Parallax (π)	2.0450±0.0240 mas
Distance	1,590 ± 20 ly (489 ± 6 pc)
Absolute magnitude (M_{V})	−0.3

Details
Mass	1.2 M_{☉}
Radius	38 R_{☉}
Luminosity	503 L_{☉}
Surface gravity (log g)	1.21 cgs
Temperature	4,035 K
Metallicity [Fe/H]	−0.18 dex
Age	4.4 Gyr

Other designations
- BD+31°370, HIP 10085, SAO 55309

Database references
SIMBAD	data

HD 13189 is a star in the northern constellation of Triangulum. With an apparent visual magnitude of +7.57, it is too faint to be visible to the normal human eye. The distance to this system is approximately 1,590 light years based on parallax measurements, and it is drifting further away with a radial velocity of 25.39 km/s. In 2005, a planetary companion or brown dwarf was announced in orbit around this star.

It has a spectral classification of K1II-III, making it a giant star that has evolved away from the main sequence after exhausting the hydrogen at its core. The mass is 1.2 times the Sun's, while measurements of the star's radius give estimates of 38 R_{☉}. The atmosphere of the star displays short period radial velocity variations with a primary period of 4.89 days. This behavior is typical for giant K-type stars such as this and it is not the result of a close-orbit planetary companion.

== HD 13189 b ==
HD 13189 b
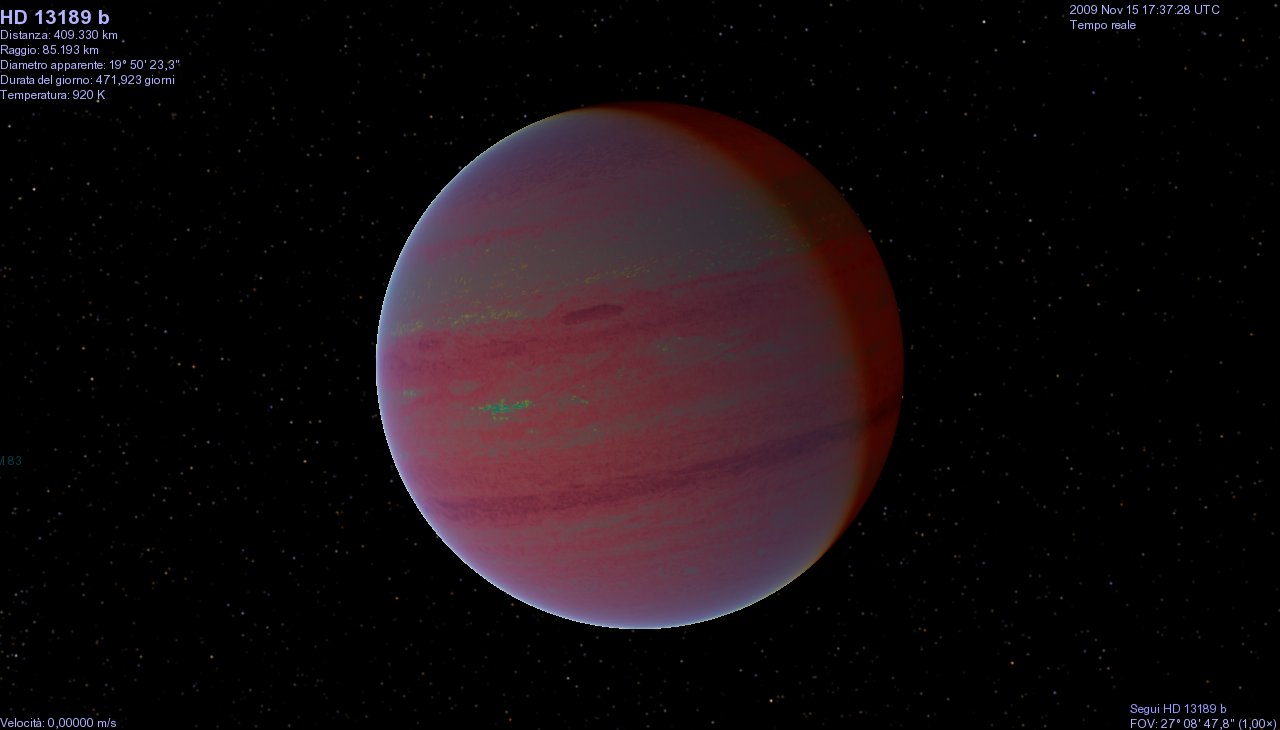
- HD 13189 b as rendered in Celestia

Discovery
- Discovered by: Hatzes et al.
- Discovery site: Tautenburg, Germany
- Discovery date: 2005
- Detection method: Radial Velocity

Orbital characteristics
- Semi-major axis: 1.85 ± 0.35 AU (277,000,000 ± 52,000,000 km)
- Eccentricity: 0.28 ± 0.06
- Orbital period (sidereal): 471.6 ± 6 d
- Time of periastron: 2452327.9 ± 20.2
- Argument of periastron: 160.7 ± 12
- Semi-amplitude: 6.8 ± 1.5

Physical characteristics
- Mass: >14 ± 6 M_{J}

HD 13189 b is an exoplanet or brown dwarf with mass ranges from 8 to 20 Jupiter mass. This object is located at a mean distance of 277 million km (1.85 AU) from the star, taking 472 days to make one elliptical orbit.

This object was discovered in Tautenburg, Germany in 2005.
