= 14 Trianguli =

Star in the constellation Triangulum

- Location of 14 Trianguli (circled)

Observation data Epoch J2000.0 Equinox ICRS
- Constellation: Triangulum
- Right ascension: 02^{h} 32^{m} 06.16977^{s}
- Declination: +36° 08′ 50.1813″
- Apparent magnitude (V): 5.14±0.01

Characteristics
- Spectral type: K5 III
- U−B color index: +1.78
- B−V color index: +1.47

Astrometry
Radial velocity (R_{v})	−36.8±0.3 km/s
Proper motion (μ)	RA: +45.066 mas/yr Dec.: +11.901 mas/yr
Parallax (π)	7.5319±0.1060 mas
Distance	433 ± 6 ly (133 ± 2 pc)
Absolute magnitude (M_{V})	−0.46

Orbit
Primary	14 Tri A
Name	14 Tri B
Period (P)	6,257±73 d
Eccentricity (e)	0.22±0.04
Periastron epoch (T)	2,448,284±166 JD
Argument of periastron (ω) (secondary)	40±11°
Semi-amplitude (K_{1}) (primary)	2.27±0.09 km/s

Details
Mass	1.85±0.09 M_{☉}
Radius	38.66±1.18 R_{☉}
Luminosity	325±17 L_{☉}
Surface gravity (log g)	1.65 cgs
Temperature	3,991 K
Metallicity [Fe/H]	−0.16 dex
Rotational velocity (v sin i)	2.1±1.2 km/s

Other designations
- 14 Trianguli, AG+35°233, BD+35°497, FK5 1070, GC 3032, HD 15656, HIP 11784, HR 736, SAO 55635

Database references
SIMBAD	data

14 Trianguli (14 Tri), also known as HD 15656, is a spectroscopic binary located in the northern constellation Triangulum. It has an apparent magnitude of 5.14, making it faintly visible to the naked eye in ideal conditions. Gaia DR3 parallax measurements place the system 433 light years away, and it is currently approaching the Solar System with a heliocentric radial velocity of −37 km/s. At its current distance, 14 Tri's brightness is diminished by 0.21 magnitude due to interstellar dust. It has an absolute magnitude of −0.46.

The visible component is an evolved red giant with a stellar classification of K5 III. It has 1.85 times the mass of the Sun, but it has expanded to 39 times its girth. It radiates 325 times the luminosity of the Sun from its photosphere at an effective temperature of 3,991 K, giving it an orangish-red hue. 14 Tri is slightly metal-deficient with [Fe/H] = −0.16, and spins modestly with a projected rotational velocity of 2.1 km/s. This is a single-lined spectroscopic binary that completes an eccentric orbit within 17 years. The secondary star has not been detected visually or in the spectrum and is expected to be a low-mass red dwarf or white dwarf. 14 Tri may be part of the Wolf 630 moving group.
