= HD 9446 =

Star with a planetary system in the constellation Triangulum

Observation data Epoch J2000 Equinox ICRS
- Constellation: Triangulum
- Right ascension: 01^{h} 33^{m} 20.1847^{s}
- Declination: +29° 15′ 54.539″
- Apparent magnitude (V): 8.35

Characteristics
- Evolutionary stage: main sequence
- Spectral type: G5V
- B−V color index: +0.680±0.015

Astrometry
Radial velocity (R_{v})	+21.2±3.1 km/s
Proper motion (μ)	RA: 190.343(28) mas/yr Dec.: −53.675(31) mas/yr
Parallax (π)	19.9200±0.0413 mas
Distance	163.7 ± 0.3 ly (50.2 ± 0.1 pc)
Absolute magnitude (M_{V})	+4.76

Details
Mass	1.07±0.18 M_{☉}
Radius	0.984±0.01 R_{☉}
Luminosity	1.1 L_{☉}
Surface gravity (log g)	4.53±0.16 cgs
Temperature	5,793±22 K
Metallicity [Fe/H]	0.09±0.05 dex
Rotational velocity (v sin i)	4±1 km/s
Age	2.0±1.5 Gyr

Other designations
- BD+28°253, HD 9446, HIP 7245, SAO 74788

Database references
SIMBAD	data
Exoplanet Archive	data

HD 9446 is a star located about 164 light-years away in the constellation of Triangulum, near the southwestern constellation border with Pisces. This object can be viewed with binoculars or a telescope, but it is too faint to be seen with the naked eye at its apparent visual magnitude of 8.35. It is drifting further away from the Sun with a radial velocity of +21 km/s.

This object is a G-type main sequence star with a stellar classification of G5V. The physical properties this star appear similar to the Sun, making it a candidate solar analog. However, the measured abundance of elements with more mass than helium is outside the accepted range. It is roughly two billion years in age and has an active chromosphere. The amount of activity measured in the chromosphere corresponds to a star with a rotation period of about 10 days.

On 5 January 2010, scientists announced the discovery of two planets orbiting around HD 9446. In addition, another exoplanet candidate is detected by astrometry in 2024.

The HD 9446 planetary system
Companion (in order from star)	Mass	Semimajor axis (AU)	Orbital period (days)	Eccentricity	Inclination (°)	Radius
b	≥ 0.687±0.0056 M_{J}	0.1892±0.0065	30.0608+0.0034 −0.0033	0.20±0.06	—	—
c	≥ 1.71±0.13 M_{J}	0.646±0.022	189.6±0.13	0.06±0.06	—	—
d (unconfirmed)	1.5 M_{J}	7.0	—	—	—	—

== See also ==
- List of extrasolar planets
