= NGC 784 =

Galaxy in the constellation Triangulum

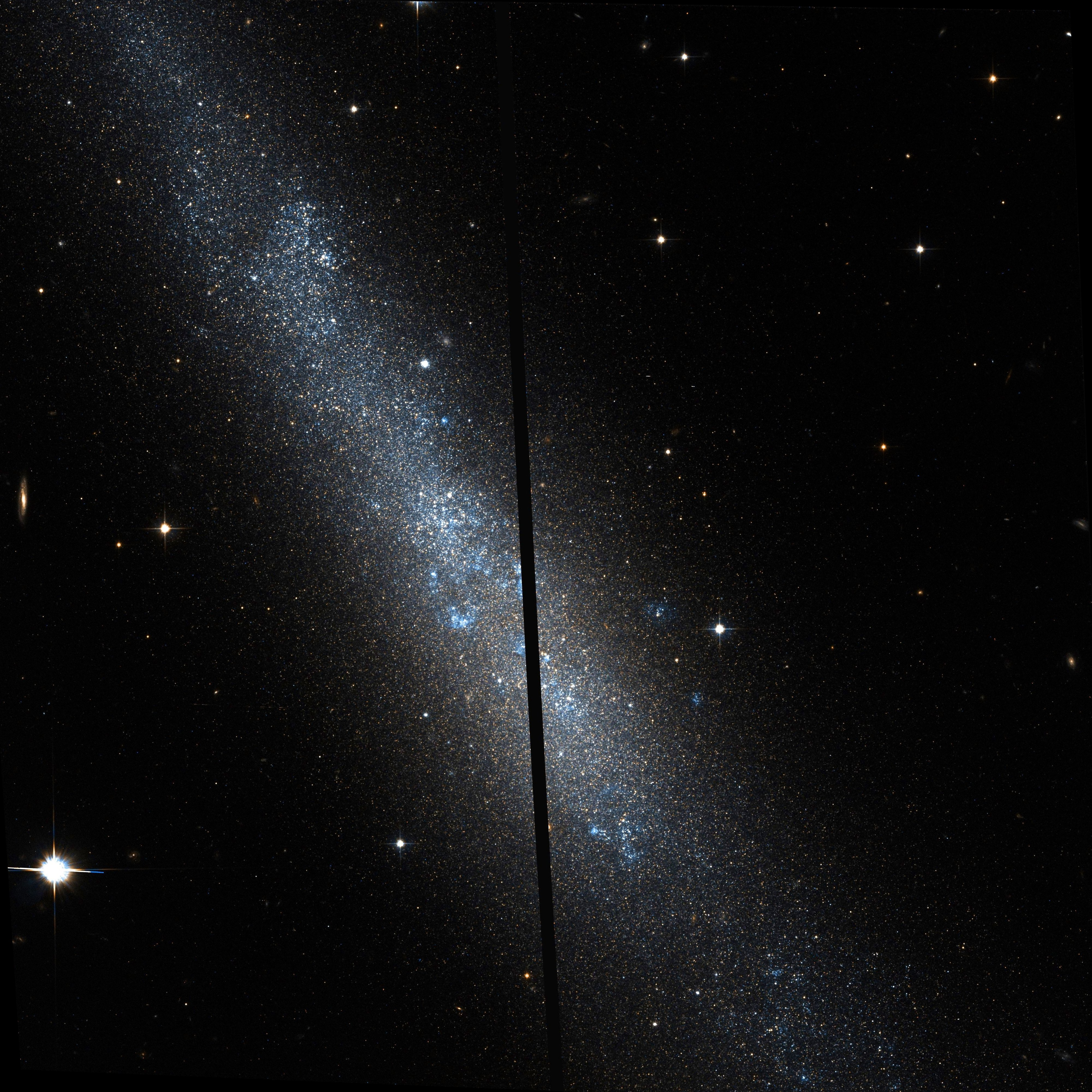
- NGC 784 imaged by the Hubble Space Telescope

Observation data (J2000 epoch)
- Constellation: Triangulum
- Right ascension: 02^{h} 01^{m} 16.9067^{s}
- Declination: 28° 50′ 12.274″
- Redshift: 0.000660
- Heliocentric radial velocity: 198±1 km/s
- Distance: 5 Mpc (16 Mly)
- Apparent magnitude (V): 12.23

Characteristics
- Type: SBdm?
- Size: ~27,300 ly (8.37 kpc) (estimated)
- Apparent size (V): 6.6′ × 1.5′

Other designations
- IRAS 01584+2836, UGC 1501, MCG +05-05-045, PGC 7671, CGCG 503-074

NGC 784 is a barred spiral galaxy about 16.0 Mly away in the constellation Triangulum. NGC 784 is located within the Virgo Supercluster. It was discovered by German astronomer Heinrich Louis d'Arrest on 20 September 1865.

== See also ==
- List of NGC objects (1–1000)
