= 1 Trianguli =

Star in the constellation Triangulum

Observation data Epoch J2000.0 Equinox ICRS
- Constellation: Triangulum
- Right ascension: 01^{h} 42^{m} 05.92475^{s}
- Declination: +29° 30′ 21.8431″
- Apparent magnitude (V): 7.52±0.01

Characteristics
- Evolutionary stage: main sequence star
- Spectral type: A2 V
- B−V color index: +0.06

Astrometry
Radial velocity (R_{v})	7±4.5 km/s
Proper motion (μ)	RA: −10.545 mas/yr Dec.: −0.288 mas/yr
Parallax (π)	4.5114±0.0515 mas
Distance	723 ± 8 ly (222 ± 3 pc)
Absolute magnitude (M_{V})	+0.78

Details
Mass	2.36^{+0.34}_{−0.30} M_{☉}
Radius	2.69±0.14 R_{☉}
Luminosity	52^{+1.5}_{−2.2} L_{☉}
Surface gravity (log g)	3.90 cgs
Temperature	9,305^{+145}_{−192} K
Metallicity [Fe/H]	−0.02 dex
Age	371±23 Myr

Other designations
- 1 Trianguli, AG+29°220, BD+28°282, GC 2068, HD 10407, HIP 7948, SAO 74880, GSC 01762-00704

Database references
SIMBAD	data

1 Trianguli, also known as HD 10407, is a star located in the northern constellation Triangulum. It has an apparent magnitude of 7.52, making it readily visible in binoculars but not to the naked eye. Gaia DR3 parallax measurements imply a distance of 723 light years and it is currently receding with a heliocentric radial velocity of 7 km/s. At its current distance 1 Trianguli's brightness is diminished by a quarter of a magnitudes due to interstellar dust and it has an absolute magnitude of +0.78. Even though it has a Flamsteed designation, 1 Trianguli is one of the 220 Flamsteed stars that are not in the Yale Bright Star Catalogue.

1 Trianguli has a stellar classification of A2 V, indicating that it is an ordinary A-type main-sequence star. It has 2.36 times the mass of the Sun and 2.69 times the Sun's radius. It radiates 52 times the luminosity of the Sun from its photosphere at an effective temperature of 9,305 K, giving it a white hue. It has a near solar metallicity at [Fe/H] = −0.02 and 1 Trianguli is estimated to be 371 million years old.
