= 7 Trianguli =

Star in the constellation Triangulum

- Location of 7 Trianguli (circled)

Observation data Epoch J2000.0 Equinox ICRS
- Constellation: Triangulum
- Right ascension: 02^{h} 15^{m} 56.2876^{s}
- Declination: +33° 21′ 32.032″
- Apparent magnitude (V): 5.25±0.01

Characteristics
- Evolutionary stage: main sequence
- Spectral type: A0 V or B9.5 V
- U−B color index: −0.03
- B−V color index: −0.01

Astrometry
Radial velocity (R_{v})	−1.3±2 km/s
Proper motion (μ)	RA: −15.234 mas/yr Dec.: −32.711 mas/yr
Parallax (π)	9.0683±0.137 mas
Distance	360 ± 5 ly (110 ± 2 pc)
Absolute magnitude (M_{V})	0.58

Details
Mass	2.77 M_{☉}
Radius	3.24±0.11 R_{☉}
Luminosity	89.1+10.5 −8.1 L_{☉}
Surface gravity (log g)	4.02±0.14 cgs
Temperature	10685±363 K
Rotational velocity (v sin i)	130 km/s
Age	283 Myr

Other designations
- 7 Trianguli, AG+33°210, BD+32°409, GC 2710, HD 13869, HIP 10559, HR 655, SAO 55397

Database references
SIMBAD	data

7 Trianguli is a solitary star located in the northern constellation Triangulum. It has an apparent magnitude of 5.25, making it faintly visible to the naked eye under ideal conditions. The star is situated at distance of 360 light years but is approaching with a heliocentric radial velocity of −1.3 km/s, which is poorly constrained.

7 Trianguli has a stellar classification of A0 V or B9.5 V, depending on the study. At present it has 2.77 times the mass of the Sun and 3.24 times the radius of the Sun. It shines at 89.1 times the luminosity of the Sun from its photosphere at an effective temperature of 10,685 K, giving it a blueish white glow. 7 Trianguli is a young star, with an age of 283 million years and spins rapidly with a projected rotational velocity of 130 km/s. It has been classified as having a peculiar spectrum, but it is considered doubtful that it is actually a chemically peculiar star.

It was once designated Eta Trianguli by John Flamsteed and was included in his Atlas Coelestis, but the designation is now dropped.

Together with δ Trianguli and γ Trianguli, it forms an optical (line-of-sight) triple.
