= XX Trianguli =

Star system in the constellation Triangulum

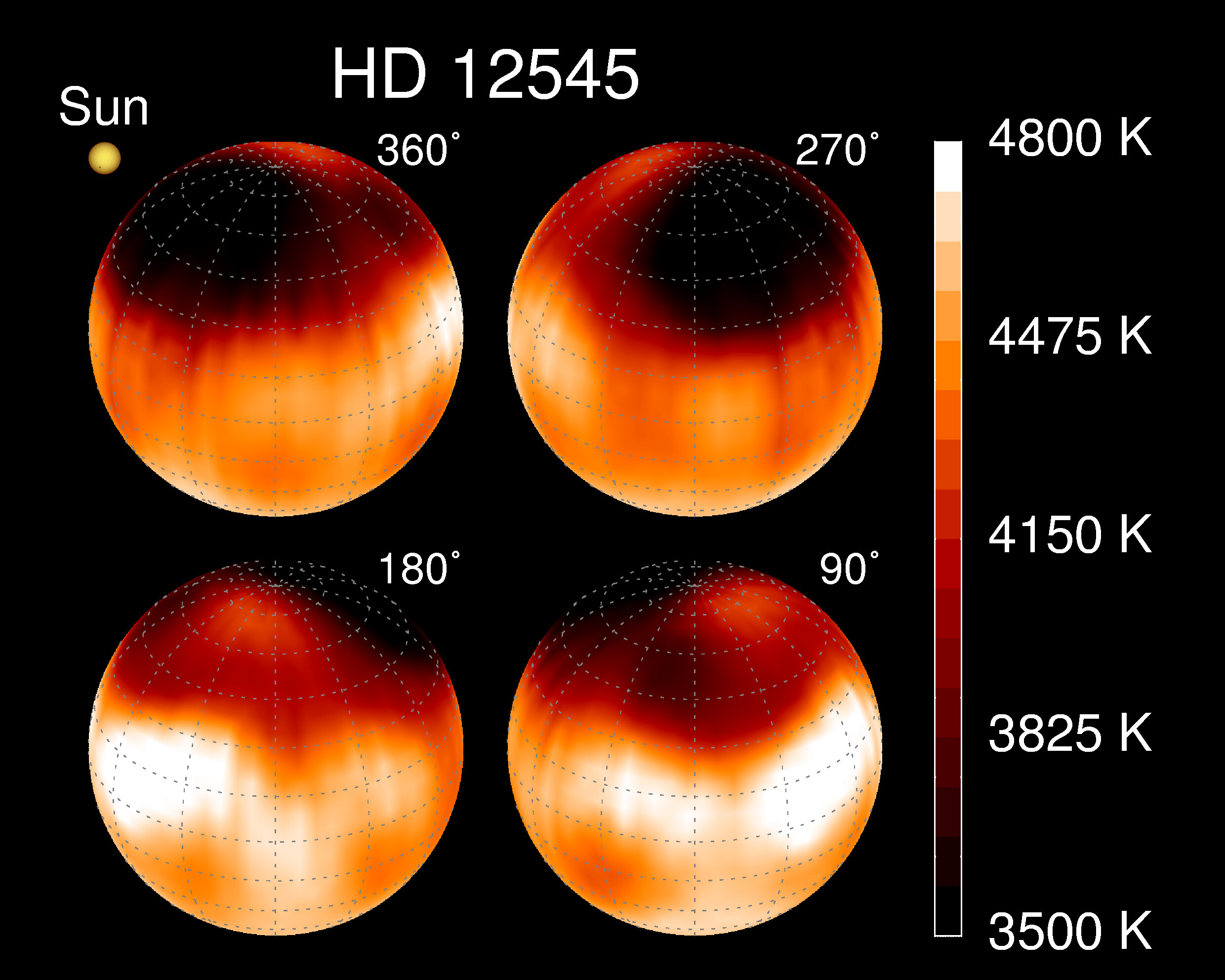
- Doppler images of a giant starspot on XX Trianguli.

Observation data Epoch J2000.0 Equinox ICRS
- Constellation: Triangulum
- Right ascension: 02^{h} 03^{m} 47.11380^{s}
- Declination: +35° 35′ 28.6692″
- Apparent magnitude (V): 8.1 – 8.7

Characteristics
- Evolutionary stage: red giant branch
- Spectral type: K0 III
- U−B color index: +0.78
- Variable type: RS CVn

Astrometry
Radial velocity (R_{v})	−26.35±0.18 km/s
Proper motion (μ)	RA: −53.222 mas/yr Dec.: −14.160 mas/yr
Parallax (π)	5.0820±0.0497 mas
Distance	642 ± 6 ly (197 ± 2 pc)

Orbit
Period (P)	23.9674±0.0005 days
Inclination (i)	60±10°

Details
Mass	1.1+0.2 −0.3 M_{☉}
Radius	8.95±0.23 R_{☉}
Luminosity	337±2 L_{☉}
Surface gravity (log g)	2.82±0.05 cgs
Temperature	4,627±46 K
Metallicity [Fe/H]	−0.13±0.04 dex
Rotation	23.470–24.716 days
Rotational velocity (v sin i)	20.0±0.6 km/s
Age	7.4+2.3 −3.2 Gyr

Other designations
- XX Tri, BD+34°363, GJ 3130, HD 12545, HIP 9630, SAO 55233

Database references
SIMBAD	data

XX Trianguli, abbreviated XX Tri, is a variable star in the northern constellation of Triangulum, about 1.5° to the WNW of Beta Trianguli along the constellation border with Andromeda. It is classified as a RS Canum Venaticorum variable and ranges in brightness from magnitude 8.1 down to 8.7, which is too faint to be visible to the naked eye. The system is located at a distance of approximately 642 light years from the Sun based on parallax, but is drifting closer with a radial velocity of −26 km/s.

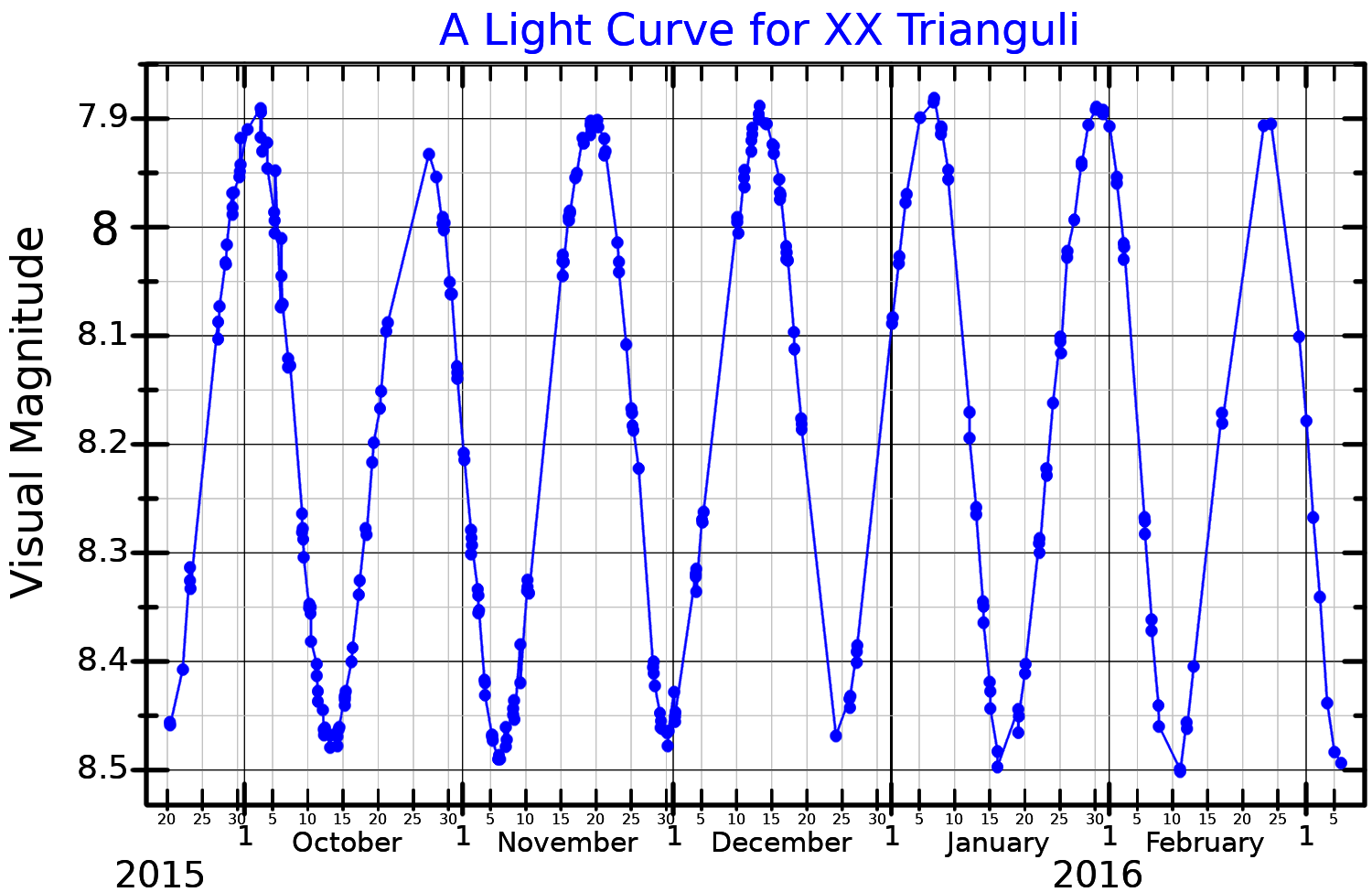
A visual band light curve for XX Trianguli, adapted from Strassmeier (1999)

The variability of the star's brightness was probably first noticed in 1985 by Brian Skiff at Lowell Observatory. It was given its variable star designation, XX Trianguli, in 1993. This is a single-lined spectroscopic binary with an orbital period of 23.96924 days. The visible component is an orange-hued K-type giant star with a stellar classification of K0 III, indicating it has exhausted the supply of hydrogen at its core then cooled and expanded off the main sequence. It is around eight billion years old with 26% more mass than the Sun and has expanded to 11 times the Sun's radius. It is radiating roughly 30 times the luminosity of the Sun from its photosphere at an effective temperature of 4,620 K.

The star is "covered with large high-latitude and even polar spots and with occasional small equatorial spots". XX Tri is notable for having a huge starspot larger than the diameter of the Sun, discovered using Doppler imaging. For its size, the star has a rapid rotation rate of about 24 days. It has a weak, Sun-like differential rotation. The star appears to show a magnetic activity cycle of 26±6 years, although only a single cycle has been observed as of 2015.
