= Alpha Trianguli =

Star in the constellation Triangulum

α Trianguli
- Location of α Trianguli (circled)

Observation data Epoch J2000.0 Equinox ICRS
- Constellation: Triangulum
- A
- Right ascension: 01^{h} 53^{m} 04.90710^{s}
- Declination: +29° 34′ 43.7801″
- Apparent magnitude (V): +3.42
- C
- Right ascension: 01^{h} 53^{m} 01.04815^{s}
- Declination: +29° 37′ 03.9309″

Characteristics

A
- Evolutionary stage: main sequence
- Spectral type: F5III to F6IV + M
- U−B color index: +0.06
- B−V color index: +0.48
- Variable type: Ellipsoidal

C
- Evolutionary stage: red dwarf

Astrometry

A
Radial velocity (R_{v})	−12.6 km/s
Proper motion (μ)	RA: +10.82 mas/yr Dec.: −234.24 mas/yr
Parallax (π)	51.50±0.23 mas
Distance	63.3 ± 0.3 ly (19.42 ± 0.09 pc)
Absolute magnitude (M_{V})	1.98

C
Radial velocity (R_{v})	−10.42±0.42 km/s
Proper motion (μ)	RA: +9.922 mas/yr Dec.: −236.07 mas/yr
Parallax (π)	50.4136±0.0197 mas
Distance	64.70 ± 0.03 ly (19.836 ± 0.008 pc)

Orbit
Primary	Aa
Secondary	Ab
Period (P)	1.767 days
Eccentricity (e)	0.065
Semi-amplitude (K_{1}) (primary)	10.64 km/s

Details

α Tri Aa
Mass	1.65 M_{☉}
Radius	3.13 R_{☉}
Luminosity	12.9 L_{☉}
Surface gravity (log g)	3.66 cgs
Temperature	6,187 K
Metallicity [Fe/H]	−0.09 to 0.00 dex
Rotational velocity (v sin i)	81.6 km/s
Age	1.7 Gyr

α Tri Ab
Mass	0.11 M_{☉}
Radius	0.14 R_{☉}

α Tri C
Mass	0.403±0.013 M_{☉}
Radius	0.406±0.012 R_{☉}
Luminosity	0.0210±0.0006 L_{☉}
Surface gravity (log g)	4.06±0.77 cgs
Temperature	3,420±114 K
Metallicity [Fe/H]	−1.20±0.04 dex

Other designations
- Mothallah, Ras al Muthallah, Caput Trianguli, α Trianguli, 2 Trianguli, HR 544, HD 11443, BD+28°312, FK5 64, HIP 8796, SAO 74996
- C: TIC 28244970, 2MASS J01530103+2937044

Database references
SIMBAD	data
- C

Alpha Trianguli (α Trianguli, abbreviated Alpha Tri, α Tri) is a triple star system in the constellation of Triangulum. Based on parallax measurements obtained during the Hipparcos mission, it is approximately 63.3 light-years (19.4 parsecs) distant from the Sun. The brighter or primary component is named Mothallah /məˈθælə/.

== Nomenclature ==
α Trianguli (Latinised to Alpha Trianguli) is the system's Bayer designation.

The system bore the traditional names Ras al Muthallah or Mothallah and Caput Trianguli derived from the Arabic رأس المثلث' raʼs al-muthallath "the head of the triangle" and its Latin translation. The International Astronomical Union Working Group on Star Names (WGSN) has approved the name Mothallah for this star. For members of multiple star systems, and where a component letter (e.g. from the Washington Double Star Catalog) is not explicitly shown in the namelist, the WGSN says that the name should be understood to be attributed to the visually brightest component by visual brightness.

In combination with Beta Trianguli, these stars were called Al Mīzān, which is Arabic for "The Scale Beam".

In Babylonian astronomy, Alpha Trianguli is listed as UR.BAR.RA "The Wolf", bearing the epithet "the seeder of the plough" in the MUL.APIN, listed after "The Plough", the name for a constellation formed of Triangulum plus Gamma Andromedae.

== Properties ==
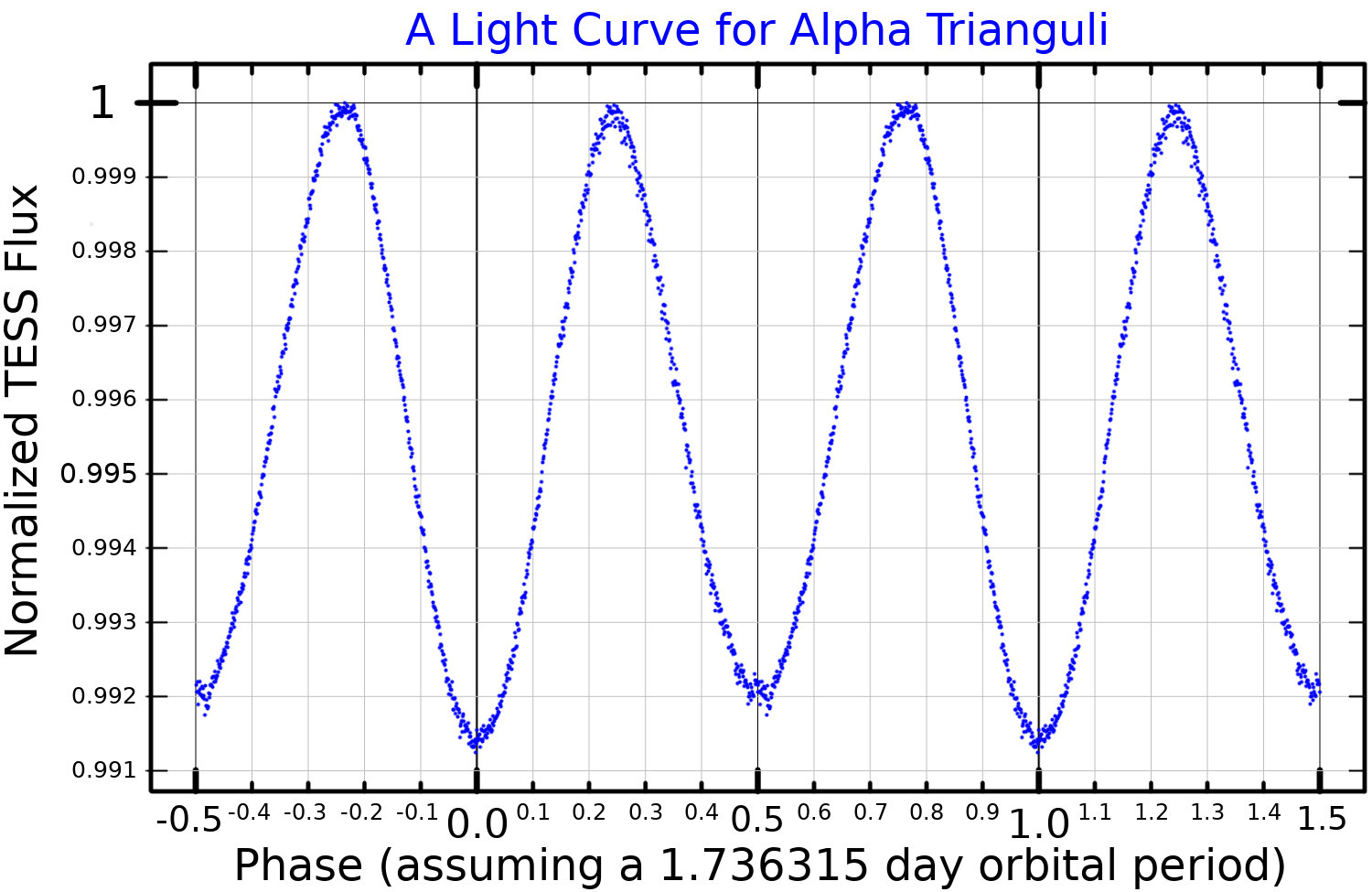
A light curve for Alpha Trianguli, plotted from TESS data

Alpha Trianguli has been known to be a spectroscopic binary since 1915. In such systems, the binary nature is deduced from periodic variations in the spectral lines, corresponding to the orbital motion of the stars. In 2018, the red dwarf star Alpha Trianguli C, separated by 35.8' from the inner pair, was discovered to have common proper motion Alpha Trianguli A, thus making the system triple.

Estimates of the combined stellar classification for the spectroscopic pair range from F5III to F6IV, with the luminosity class of 'IV' or 'III' indicating the primary component is a subgiant or giant star, respectively. It is a member of a close binary system—a spectroscopic binary—whose components complete an orbit about their center of mass once every 1.736 days. Because the primary star is rotating rapidly, it has assumed the shape of an oblate spheroid. The ellipsoidal profile of the star, as viewed from Earth, varies over the course of an orbit causing the luminosity to vary in magnitude during the same period. Such stars are termed ellipsoidal variables. Within a few million years, as the primary continues to evolve into a red giant star, the system may become a semi-detached binary with the Roche lobe becoming filled to overflowing.

The mean apparent magnitude of +3.42 for this pair is bright enough to be readily seen with the naked eye. It forms the second brightest star or star system in this generally faint constellation, following Beta Trianguli. The effective temperature of the primary's outer envelope is 6,187 K giving it a yellow-white hue typical of F-type stars. It has a radius about three times the radius of the Sun. The system is an estimated 1.7 billion years old.

A number of faint stars have been listed as companions to Alpha Trianguli in multiple star catalogues. Of these, all except the red dwarf Alpha Trianguli C are apparently unrelated background stars.
