= Triangulum =

Constellation in the northern celestial hemisphere

- Constellation
- List of stars in Triangulum
- Abbreviation: Tri
- Genitive: Trianguli
- Pronunciation: /traɪˈæŋɡjʊləm/, genitive /traɪˈæŋɡjʊlaɪ/
- Symbolism: The Triangle
- Right ascension: 01^{h} 31.3^{m} –02^{h} 50.4^{m}
- Declination: 25.60°–37.35°
- Quadrant: NQ1
- Area: 132 sq. deg. (78th)
- Main stars: 3
- Bayer/Flamsteed stars: 14
- Stars brighter than 3.00^{m}: 0
- Stars within 10.00 pc (32.62 ly): 0
- Brightest star: β Tri (Alaybasan) (3.00^{m})
- Nearest star: GJ 3147
- Messier objects: 1
- Bordering constellations: Andromeda; Pisces; Aries; Perseus
- Visible at latitudes between +90° and −53°. Best visible at 21:00 (9 p.m.) during the month of December.

Triangulum is a small constellation in the northern sky. Its name is Latin for "triangle", derived from its three brightest stars, which form a long and narrow triangle. Known to the ancient Babylonians and Greeks, Triangulum was one of the 48 constellations listed by the 2nd century astronomer Ptolemy. The celestial cartographers Johann Bayer and John Flamsteed catalogued the constellation's stars, giving six of them Bayer designations.

The white stars Beta and Gamma Trianguli, of apparent magnitudes 3.00 and 4.00, respectively, form the base of the triangle and the yellow-white Alpha Trianguli, of magnitude 3.41, the apex. Iota Trianguli is a notable double star system, and there are three star systems with known planets located in Triangulum. The constellation contains several galaxies, the brightest and nearest of which is the Triangulum Galaxy or Messier 33—a member of the Local Group. The first quasar ever observed, 3C 48, also lies within the boundaries of Triangulum.

== History and mythology ==
In the Babylonian star catalogues, Triangulum, together with Gamma Andromedae, formed the constellation known as ^{MUL}APIN (𒀯𒀳) "The Plough". It is notable as the first constellation presented on (and giving its name to) a pair of tablets containing canonical star lists that were compiled around 1000 BC, the MUL.APIN. The Plough was the first constellation of the "Way of Enlil"—that is, the northernmost quarter of the Sun's path, which corresponds to the 45 days on either side of summer solstice. Its first appearance in the pre-dawn sky (heliacal rising) in February marked the time to begin spring ploughing in Mesopotamia.

The Ancient Greeks called Triangulum Deltoton (Δελτωτόν), as the constellation resembled an upper-case Greek letter delta (Δ). It was transliterated by Roman writers, then later Latinised as Deltotum. Eratosthenes linked it with the Nile Delta, while the Roman writer Hyginus associated it with the triangular island of Sicily, formerly known as Trinacria due to its shape. It was also called Sicilia, because the Romans believed Ceres, patron goddess of Sicily, begged Jupiter to place the island in the heavens. Greek astronomers such as Hipparchos and Ptolemy called it Trigonon (Τρίγωνον), and later, it was Romanized as Trigonum. Other names referring to its shape include Tricuspis and Triquetrum. Alpha and Beta Trianguli were called Al Mīzān, which is Arabic for "The Scale Beam". In Chinese astronomy, Gamma Andromedae and neighbouring stars including Beta, Gamma and Delta Trianguli were called Tian Dajiangjun (天大将军, "Heaven's great general"), representing honour in astrology and a great general in mythology.

Later, the 17th-century German celestial cartographer Johann Bayer called the constellation Triplicitas and Orbis terrarum tripertitus, for the three regions Europe, Asia, and Africa. Triangulus Septentrionalis was a name used to distinguish it from Triangulum Australe, the Southern Triangle. Polish astronomer Johannes Hevelius excised three faint stars—ι, 10 and 12 Trianguli—to form the new constellation of Triangulum Minus in his 1690 Firmamentum Sobiescianum, renaming the original as Triangulum Majus. The smaller constellation was not recognised by the International Astronomical Union (IAU) when the constellations were established in the 1920s.

== Characteristics ==
A small constellation, Triangulum is bordered by Andromeda to the north and west, Pisces to the west and south, Aries to the south, and Perseus to the east. The centre of the constellation lies halfway between Gamma Andromedae and Alpha Arietis. The three-letter abbreviation for the constellation, as adopted by the IAU in 1922, is "Tri". The official constellation boundaries, as set by Belgian astronomer Eugène Delporte in 1930, are defined as a polygon of 14 segments. In the equatorial coordinate system, the right ascension coordinates of these borders lie between 01^{h} 31.3^{m} and 02^{h} 50.4^{m} , while the declination coordinates are between 25.60° and 37.35°. Covering 132 square degrees and 0.320% of the night sky, Triangulum ranks 78th of the 88 constellations in size.

== Features ==
Bayer catalogued five stars in the constellation, giving them the Bayer designations Alpha to Epsilon. John Flamsteed added Eta, Iota and four Roman letters; of these, only Iota is still used as the others were dropped in subsequent catalogues and star charts. Flamsteed gave 16 stars Flamsteed designations, of which numbers 1 and 16 are not used—1's coordinates were in error as there was no star present at the location that corresponds to any star in his Catalogus Britannicus; Baily presumed that the coordinates were mistranscribed 32^{s} in error by Flamsteed and in fact referred to 7.4 magnitude HD 10407. Baily also noted that 16 Trianguli was closer to Aries and included it in the latter constellation.

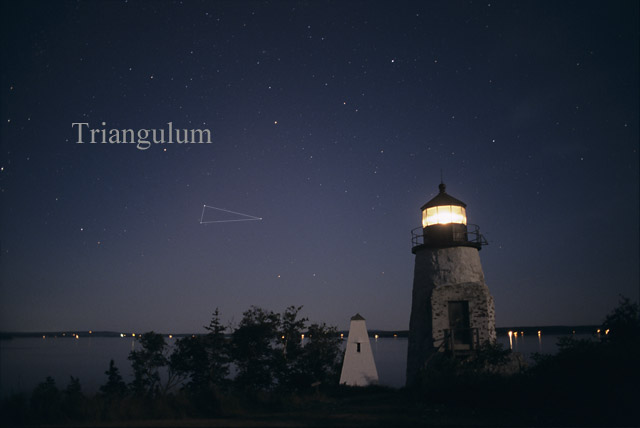
The constellation Triangulum as it can be seen by the naked eye.

=== Stars ===
Three stars make up the long narrow triangle that gives the constellation its name. The brightest member is the white giant star Beta Trianguli (the proper name is Alaybasan since 7 November 2025) of apparent magnitude 3.00, lying 127 light-years distant from Earth. It is actually a spectroscopic binary system; the primary is a white star of spectral type A5IV with 3.5 times the mass of the Sun that is beginning to expand and evolve off the main sequence. The secondary is poorly known, but calculated to be a yellow-white F-type main-sequence star around 1.4 solar masses. The two orbit around a common centre of gravity every 31 days, and are surrounded by a ring of dust that extends from 50 to 400 AU away from the stars.

The second-brightest star, the yellow-white subgiant star Alpha Trianguli (3.41^{m}) with a close dimmer companion, is also known as Caput Trianguli or Ras al Muthallath, and is at the apex of the triangle. It lies around 7 degrees north-northwest of Alpha Arietis. Making up the triangle is Gamma Trianguli (the proper name is Apdu since 13 November 2025), a white main sequence star of spectral type A1Vnn of apparent magnitude 4.00 about 112 light-years from Earth. It is around double the size of and around 33 times as luminous as the sun and rotates rapidly. Like Beta, it is surrounded by a dusty debris disk, which has a radius 80 times the distance of the Earth from the Sun. Lying near Gamma and forming an optical triple system with it are Delta (the proper name is Deltoton since 17 June 2025) and 7 Trianguli. Delta is a spectroscopic binary system composed of two yellow main sequence stars of similar dimensions to the Sun that lies 35 light-years from Earth. The two stars orbit each other every ten days and are a mere 0.1 AU apart. This system is the closest in the constellation to the Earth. Only of magnitude 5.25, 7 Trianguli is much further away at around 280 light-years distant from Earth.

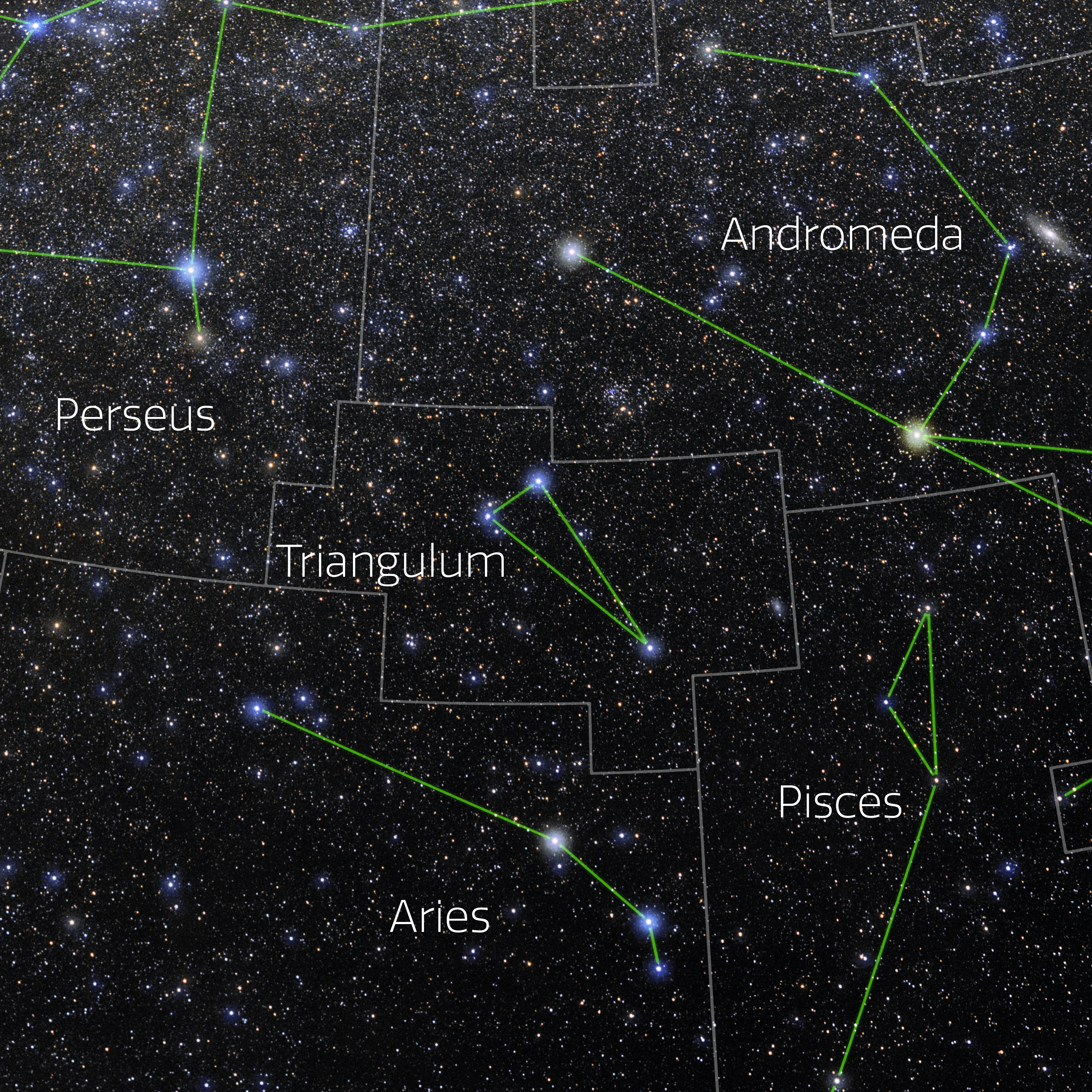
The constellation Triangulum showing the IAU boundaries, the constellation stick figure, and labels for its brightest stars. Astrophotograph by Eckhard Slawik, from NOIRLab's 88 Constellations project.

Iota Trianguli (the proper name is Triminus since 25 August 2025) is a double star whose components can be separated by medium-sized telescopes into a strong yellow and a contrasting pale blue star. Both of these are themselves close binaries. X Trianguli is an eclipsing binary system that ranges between magnitudes 8.5 and 11.2 over a period of 0.97 days. RW Trianguli is a cataclysmic variable star system composed of a white dwarf primary and an orange main sequence star of spectral type K7 V. The former is drawing off matter from the latter, forming a prominent accretion disc. The system is around 1076 light-years distant.

R Trianguli is a long period (Mira) variable that ranges from magnitude 6.2 to 11.7 over a period of 267 days. It is a red giant of spectral type M3.5-8e, lying around 960 light-years away. HD 12545, also known as XX Trianguli, is an orange giant of spectral type K0III around 520 light-years distant with a visual magnitude of 8.42. A huge starspot larger than the diameter of the Sun was detected on its surface in 1999 by astronomers using Doppler imaging.

Two star systems appear to have planets. HD 9446 is a Sun-like star around 171 light-years distant that has two planets of masses 0.7 and 1.8 times that of Jupiter, with orbital periods of 30 and 193 days respectively. HD 13189 is an orange giant of spectral type K2II about 2–7 times as massive as the Sun with a planetary or brown dwarf companion between 8 and 20 times as massive as Jupiter, which takes 472 days to complete an orbit. It is one of the largest stars discovered to have a planetary companion.

=== Deep-sky objects ===
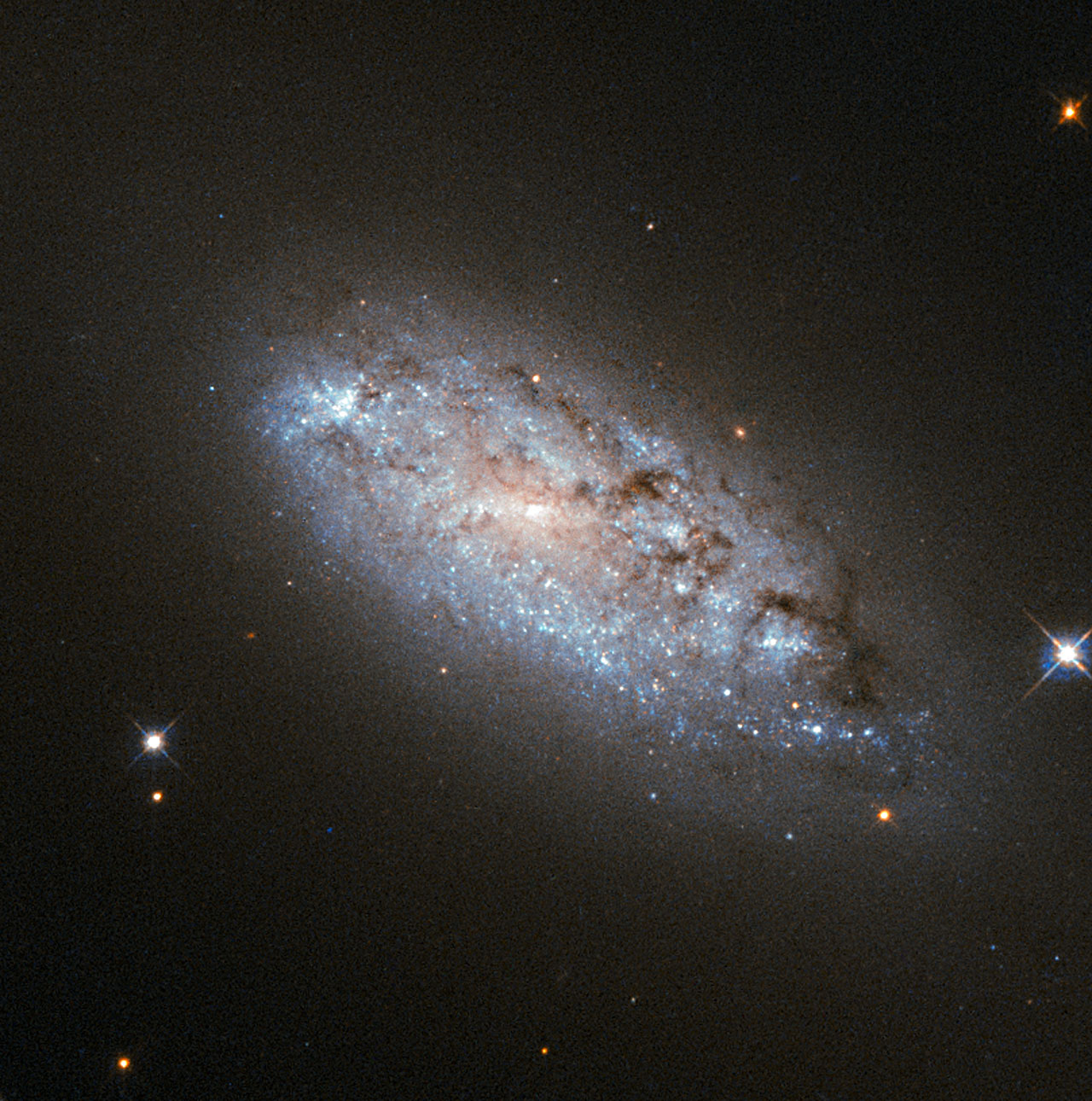
The peculiar asymmetry of NGC 949.

The Triangulum Galaxy, also known as Messier 33, was discovered by Giovanni Battista Hodierna in the 17th century. A distant member of the Local Group, it is about 2.3 million light-years away, and at magnitude 5.8 it is bright enough to be seen by the naked eye under dark skies. Being a diffuse object, it is challenging to see under light-polluted skies, even with a small telescope or binoculars, and low power is required to view it. It is a spiral galaxy with a diameter of 46,000 light-years and is thus smaller than both the Andromeda Galaxy and the Milky Way. A distance of less than 300 kiloparsecs between it and Andromeda supports the hypothesis that it is a satellite of the larger galaxy. It is believed to have been interacting with it from their velocities. Within the constellation, it lies near the border of Pisces, 3.5 degrees west-northwest of Alpha Trianguli and 7 degrees southwest of Beta Andromedae. Within the galaxy, NGC 604 is an H II region where star formation takes place.

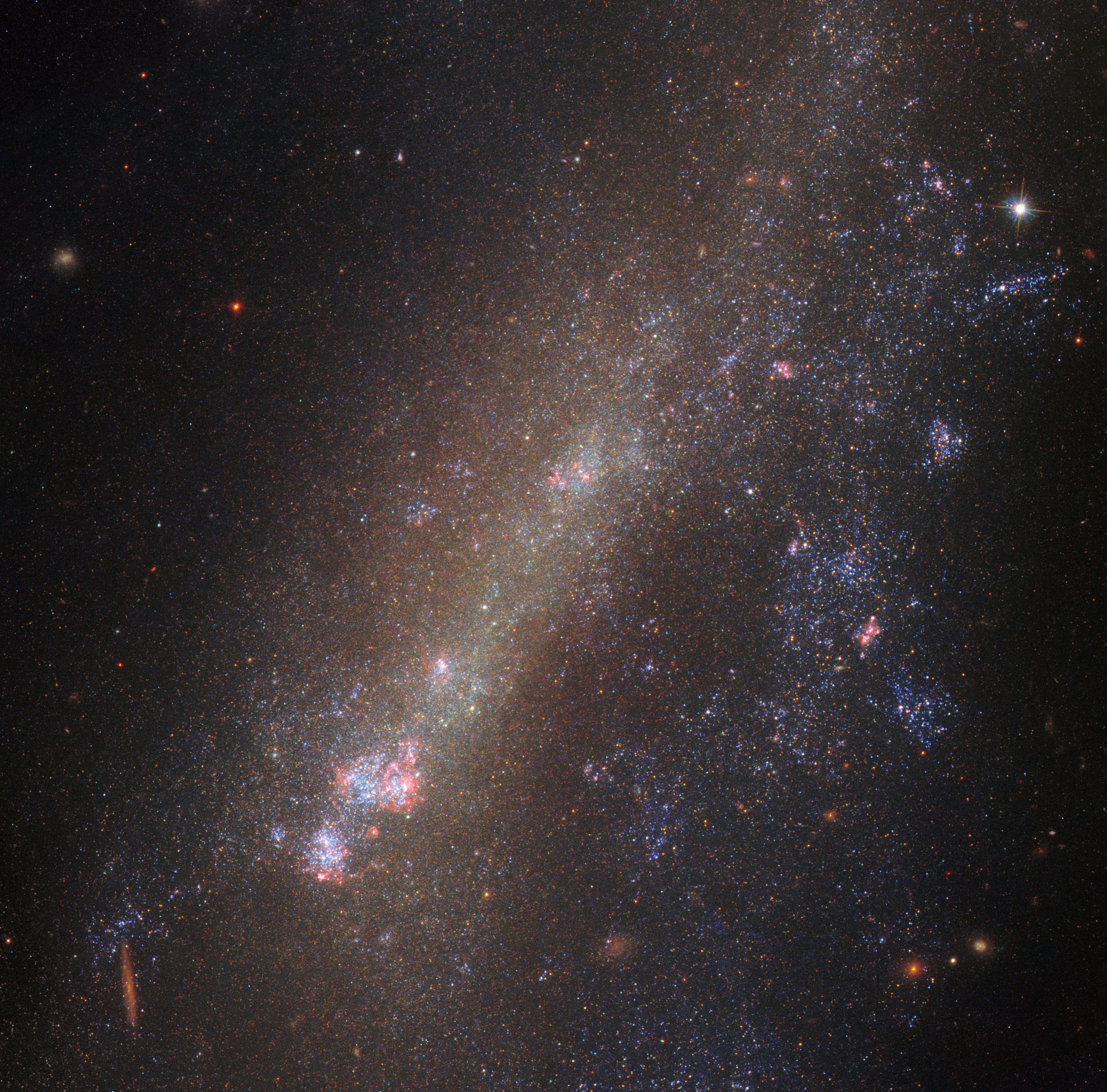
IC 1727 and UGC 1249.

In addition to M33, there are several NGC galaxies of visual magnitudes 12 to 14. The largest of these include the 10 arcminute long magnitude 12 NGC 925 spiral galaxy and the 5 arcminute long magnitude 11.6 NGC 672 barred spiral galaxy. The latter is close by and appears to be interacting with IC 1727. The two are 88,000 light-years apart and lie around 18 million light-years away. These two plus another four nearby dwarf irregular galaxies constitute the NGC 672 group, and all six appear to have had a burst of star formation in the last ten million years. The group is thought connected to another group of six galaxies known as the NGC 784 group, named for its principal galaxy, the barred spiral NGC 784. Together with two isolated dwarf galaxies, these fourteen appear to be moving in a common direction and constitute a group possibly located on a dark matter filament. 3C 48 was the first quasar ever to be observed, although its true identity was not uncovered until after that of 3C 273 in 1963. It has an apparent magnitude of 16.2 and is located about 5 degrees northwest of Alpha Trianguli.

== See also ==
- Triangulum (Chinese astronomy)
