= Maenalus =

Maenalus could refer to:

- Maenalus (town), a town of ancient Arcadia
- Maenalus (mythology), an Arcadian prince, son of Lycaon (king of Arcadia)
- Mainalo, also known as Maenalus, a mountain in Arcadia
- Mons Maenalus, a historical constellation named after the mountain
- 109 Virginis, a star named Maenalus after the constellation
