= 10 Trianguli =

Star in the constellation Triangulum

- Location of 10 Trianguli (circled)

Observation data Epoch J2000.0 Equinox ICRS
- Constellation: Triangulum
- Right ascension: 02^{h} 18^{m} 56.99355^{s}
- Declination: +28° 38′ 33.6322″
- Apparent magnitude (V): 5.29±0.01

Characteristics
- Evolutionary stage: main sequence star
- Spectral type: A2 V
- U−B color index: +0.02
- B−V color index: +0.04

Astrometry
Radial velocity (R_{v})	0.4±0.1 km/s
Proper motion (μ)	RA: +7.073 mas/yr Dec.: +0.836 mas/yr
Parallax (π)	8.9971±0.0729 mas
Distance	363 ± 3 ly (111.1 ± 0.9 pc)
Absolute magnitude (M_{V})	−0.02

Details
Mass	2.83±0.05 M_{☉}
Radius	3.71±0.19 R_{☉}
Luminosity	108^{+10}_{−9} L_{☉}
Surface gravity (log g)	3.73 cgs
Temperature	9,023 K
Metallicity [Fe/H]	+0.33 dex
Rotational velocity (v sin i)	22±2 km/s
Age	372±44 Myr

Other designations
- 1 H. Trianguli Minus, 10 Tri, AG+28° 262, BD+27°360, GC 2781, HD 14252, HIP 10793, HR 675, SAO 75276

Database references
SIMBAD	data

10 Trianguli (HD 14252; HR 675; 1 H. Trianguli Minus), or simply 10 Tri is a solitary star located in the northern constellation Triangulum. It is faintly visible to the naked eye as a white-hued point of light with an apparent magnitude of 5.29. Gaia DR3 parallax measurements imply a distance of 363 light-years and it is slowly receding with a heliocentric radial velocity of 0.4 km/s. At its current distance, 10 Tri's brightness is diminished by an interstellar extinction of 0.11 magnitudes and it has an absolute magnitude of −0.02.

10 Trianguli has a stellar classification of A2 V, indicating that it is an ordinary A-type main-sequence star that is generating energy via hydrogen fusion at its core. It has 2.83 times the mass of the Sun and a slightly enlarged radius 3.71 times that of the Sun. It radiates 108 times the luminosity of the Sun from its photosphere at an effective temperature of 9,023 K. 10 Trianguli is rather evolved for its class, having completed 92.5% of its main sequence lifetime at the age of 372 million years. It is metal enriched with an iron abundance of [Fe/H] = +0.33 or % of the Sun's and unlike most hot stars, it spins modestly with a projected rotational velocity of 22 km/s.

10 Trianguli has a 13th magnitude companion located 58.3" away along a position angle of 205°. It is an unrelated background star that is much more distant than 10 Trianguli. Together with ι Trianguli and 12 Trianguli, it forms part of the obsolete Triangulum Minus.

It was once designated a Trianguli by John Flamsteed and was included in his Atlas Coelestis, but the designation is now dropped.
