= Selenography =

Study of the surface and shape of the Moon

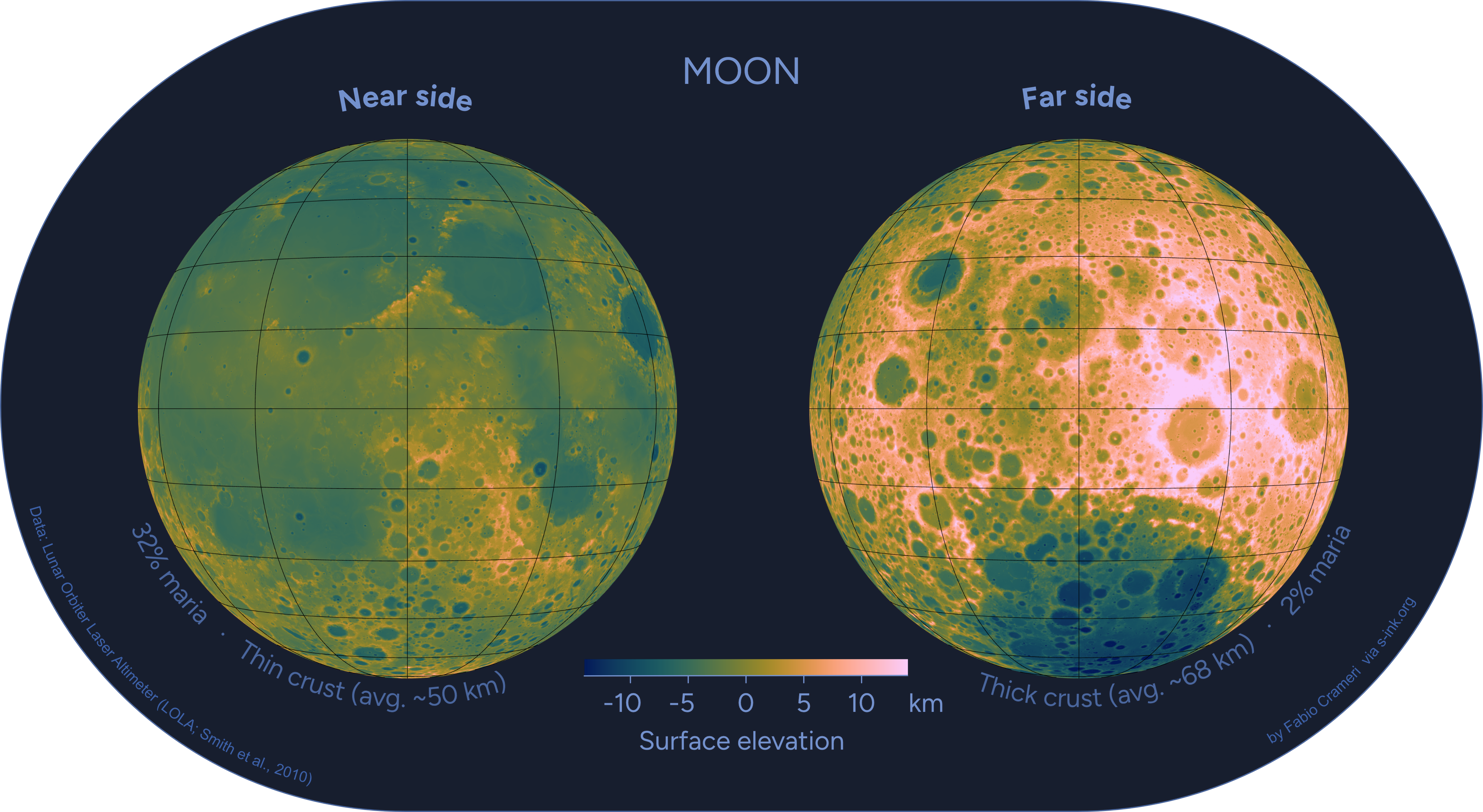
The topography of the Moon.

Animation of Moon rotation

Selenography is the study of the surface and physical features of the Moon (also known as geography of the Moon, or selenodesy). Like geography and areography, selenography is a subdiscipline within the field of planetary science. Historically, the principal concern of selenographists was the mapping and naming of the lunar terrane identifying maria, craters, mountain ranges, and other various features.

This task was largely finished when high resolution images of the near and far sides of the Moon were obtained by orbiting spacecraft during the early space era. Some regions of the Moon remain poorly imaged, especially near the poles, and the exact locations of many features, like crater depths, are uncertain by several kilometers. Today, selenography is considered to be a subdiscipline of selenology, which is most often referred to as simply "Lunar science."

== History ==
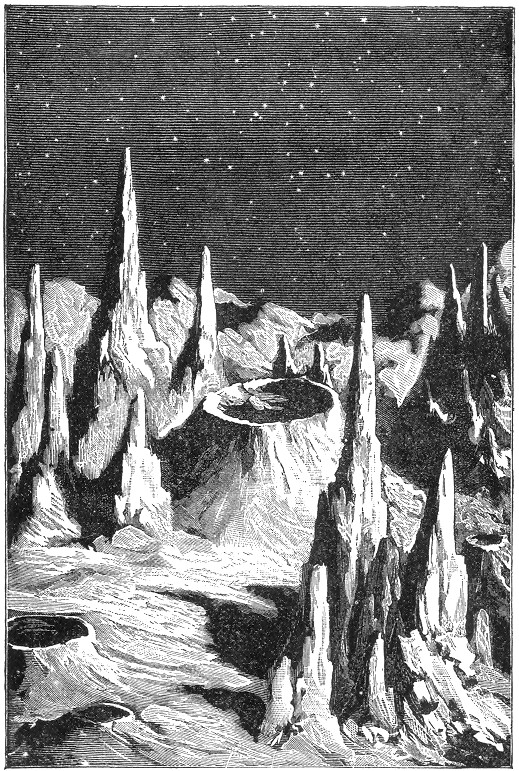
"Lunar Day," from the book Recreations in Astronomy by H. D. Warren D. D., 1879. Later study showed that the surface features are much more rounded due to a long history of impacts.

The word" selenography" is derived from the Greek word Σελήνη (Selene, meaning Moon) and γράφω (graphō, meaning to write).

The idea that the Moon is not perfectly smooth originates to at least c. 450 BC, when Democritus asserted that the Moon's "lofty mountains and hollow valleys" were the cause of its markings. At the end of the 15th century AD, serious selenography began. Around AD 1603, William Gilbert made the first lunar drawing based on naked-eye observation.

Others soon followed, and when the telescope was invented, initial drawings of poor accuracy were made, but soon thereafter improved in tandem with optics. In the early 18th century, the librations of the Moon were measured, which revealed that more than half of the lunar surface was visible to observers on Earth. In 1750, Johann Meyer produced the first reliable set of lunar coordinates that permitted astronomers to locate lunar features.

Lunar mapping became systematic in 1779 when Johann Schröter began meticulous observation and measurement of lunar topography. In 1834 Johann Heinrich von Mädler published the first large cartograph map of the Moon, comprising 4 sheets, and he published The Universal Selenography. All lunar measurement was based on direct observation until March 1840, when J.W. Draper, using a 5-inch reflector, produced a daguerreotype of the Moon and introduced photography to astronomy. At first, the images were of very poor quality, but as with the telescope 200 years earlier, their quality rapidly improved. By 1890 lunar photography had become a recognized subdiscipline of astronomy.

== Lunar photography ==
A color map of the Moon and heightmap rendered together with Blender

The 20th century witnessed more advances in selenography. In 1959, the Soviet spacecraft Luna 3 transmitted the first photographs of the far side of the Moon, giving the first view of it in history. The United States launched the Ranger spacecraft between 1961 and 1965 to photograph the lunar surface until the instant they impacted it. The Lunar Orbiters between 1966 and 1967 photographed the Moon from orbit. The Surveyors between 1966 and 1968 photographed and softly landed on the lunar surface.

The Soviet Lunokhods 1 (1970) and 2 (1973) traversed almost 50 km of the lunar surface, making detailed photographs of the lunar surface. The Clementine spacecraft obtained the first nearly global cartographic map of the lunar topography, and multispectral images. Successive missions transmitted photographs of increasing resolution.

== Lunar topography ==
The Moon has been measured by the methods of laser altimetry and stereo image analysis, including data obtained during several missions. The most visible topographical feature is the giant far-side South Pole-Aitken basin, which possesses the lowest elevations of the Moon. The highest elevations are found just to the northeast of this basin, and it has been suggested that this area might represent thick ejecta deposits that were emplaced during an oblique South Pole-Aitken basin impact event. Other large impact basins, such as the maria Imbrium, Serenitatis, Crisium, Smythii, and Orientale, also possess regionally low elevations and elevated rims.

Another distinguishing feature of the Moon's shape is that the elevations are on average about 1.9 km higher on the far side than the near side. If it is assumed that the crust is in isostatic equilibrium, and that the density of the crust is everywhere the same, then the higher elevations would be associated with a thicker crust. Using gravity, topography and seismic data, the crust is thought to be on average about 50 ± 15 km thick, with the far-side crust being on average thicker than the near side by about 15 km.

== Lunar cartography and toponymy ==
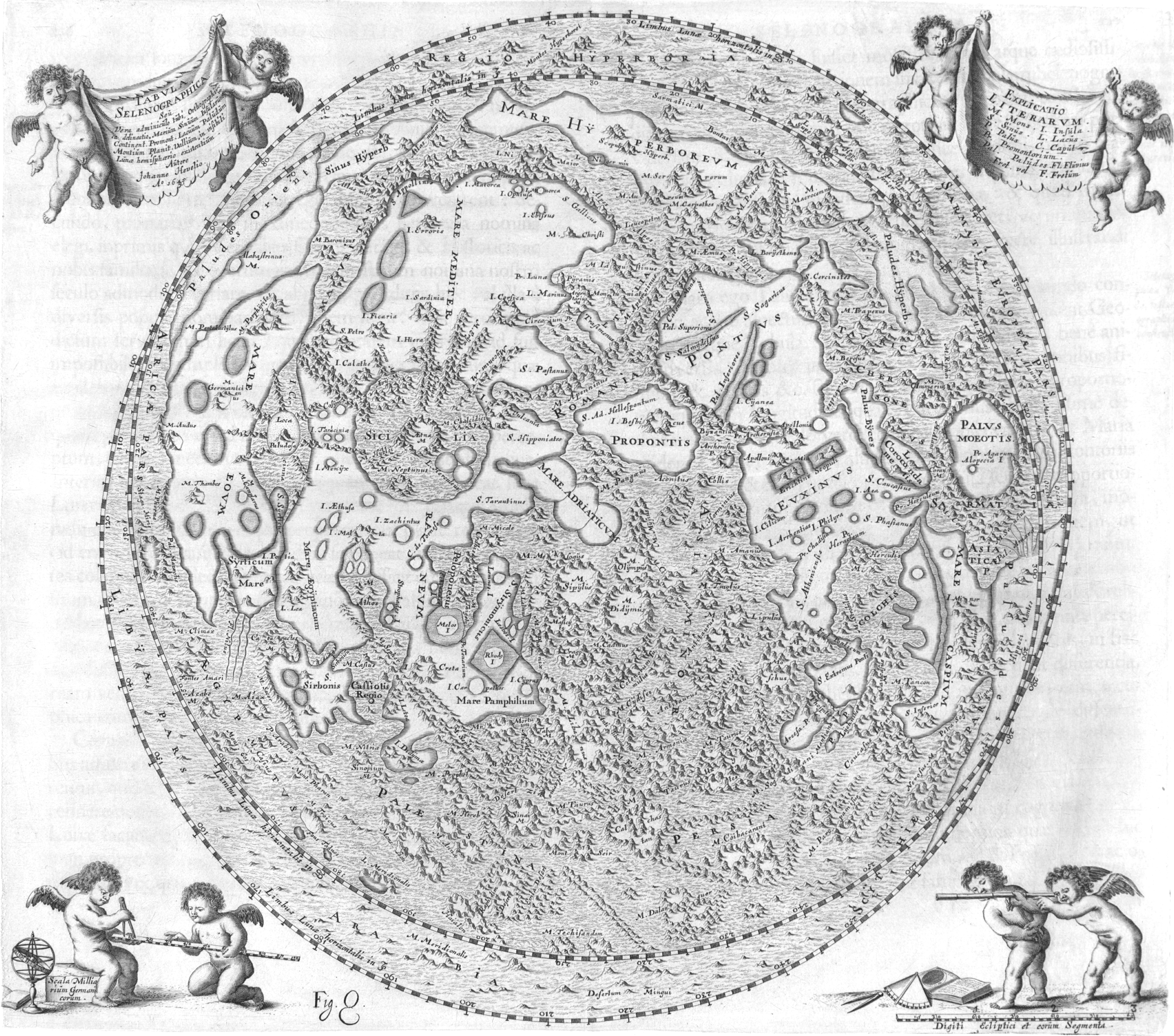
A 1647 map of the Moon by Johannes Hevelius

The oldest known illustration of the Moon was found in a passage grave in Knowth, County Meath, Ireland. The tomb was carbon dated to 3330–2790 BC. Around 1500, Leonardo da Vinci made and annotated some sketches of the Moon. In the late 16th century, William Gilbert made a drawing of the Moon in which he denominated a dozen surface features. It was published posthumously in De Mondo Nostro Sublunari Philosophia Nova. After the invention of the telescope, Thomas Harriot (1609), Galileo Galilei (1609), and Christoph Scheiner (1614) made drawings of the moon.

In 1645, denominations of the surface features of the Moon, based on telescopic observation, were made by Michael van Langren. Many of his denominations were distinctly Catholic, denominating craters in honor of Catholic royalty and capes and promontories in honor of Catholic saints. The lunar maria were denominated in Latin for terrestrial seas and oceans. Minor craters were denominated in honor of astronomers, mathematicians, and other famous scholars.

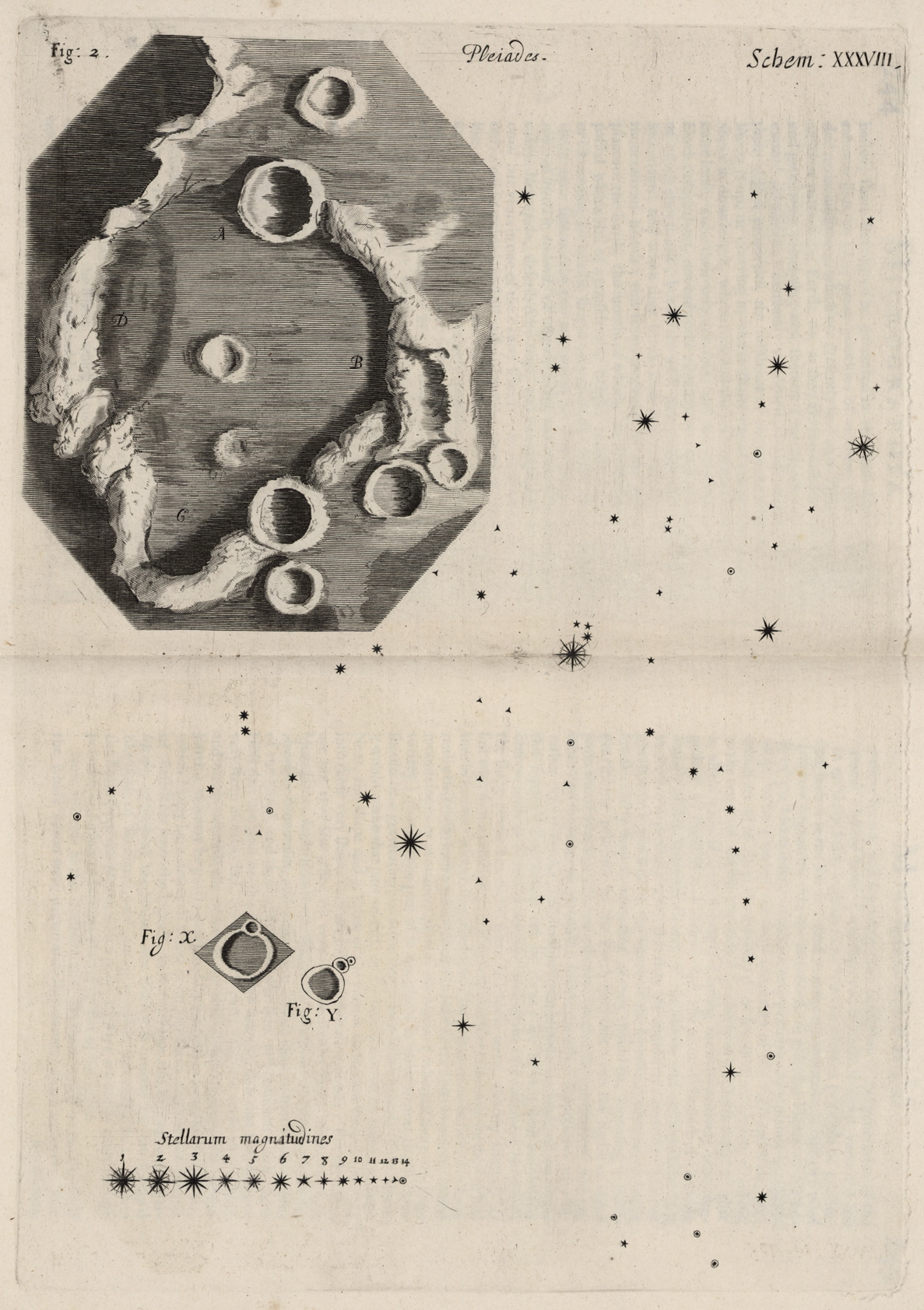
A 1665 study of the Moon from Robert Hooke's Micrographia

In 1647, Johannes Hevelius produced the rival work Selenographia, the first lunar atlas. Hevelius ignored the nomenclature of Van Langren and denominated the lunar topography according to terrestrial features, such that the names of lunar features corresponded to the toponyms of their geographical terrestrial counterparts, especially as Earth's features were denominated by the ancient Roman and Greek civilizations. This work of Hevelius influenced his contemporary European astronomers, and the Selenographia was the standard reference on selenography for over a century.

Giambattista Riccioli, SJ, a Catholic priest and scholar who lived in northern Italy authored the present scheme of Latin lunar nomenclature. His Almagestum novum was published in 1651 as summary of then current astronomical thinking and recent developments. In particular he outlined the arguments in favor of and against various cosmological models, both heliocentric and geocentric. Almagestum Novum contained scientific reference matter based on contemporary knowledge, and contemporary educators across Europe widely used it. Although this handbook of astronomy has long since been superseded, its system of lunar nomenclature is used even today.

The lunar illustrations in the Almagestum novum were drawn by a fellow Jesuit educator named Francesco Grimaldi, SJ. The nomenclature was based on a subdivision of the visible lunar surface into octants that were numbered in Roman style from I to VIII. Octant I referenced the northwest section and subsequent octants proceeded clockwise in alignment with compass directions. Thus Octant VI was to the south and included Clavius and Tycho Craters.

The Latin nomenclature had two components: the first denominated the broad features of terrae (lands) and maria (seas) and the second denominated the craters. Riccioli authored lunar toponyms derived from the names of various conditions, including climactic ones, whose causes were historically attributed to the Moon. Thus there were the seas of crises ("Mare Crisium"), serenity ("Mare Serenitatis"), and fertility ("Mare Fecunditatis"). There were also the seas of rain ("Mare Imbrium"), clouds ("Mare Nubium"), and cold ("Mare Frigoris").

The topographical features between the maria were comparably denominated, but were opposite the toponyms of the maria. Thus there were the lands of sterility ("Terra Sterilitatis"), heat ("Terra Caloris"), and life ("Terra Vitae"). These names for the highland regions were supplanted on later cartographs (maps). See List of features on the Moon for a complete list.

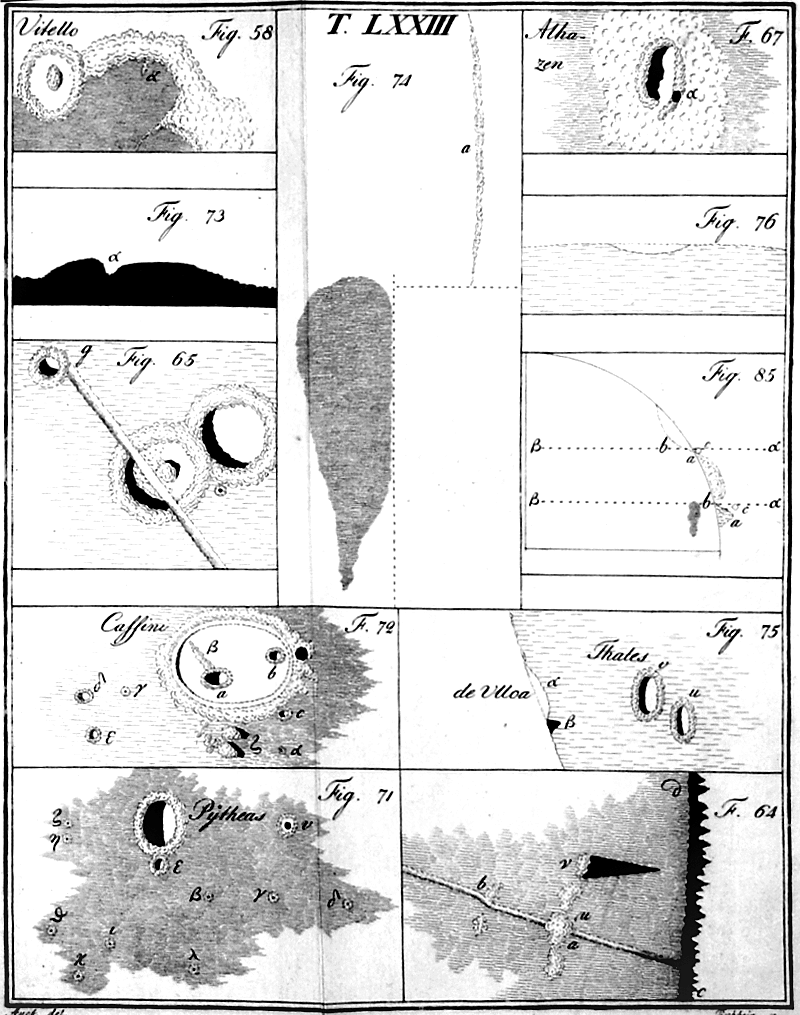
Lunar maps from 1791 in the Selenetopographische Fragmente by Johann Hieronymus Schröter.

Many of the craters were denominated topically pursuant to the octant in which they were located. Craters in Octants I, II, and III were primarily denominated based on names from ancient Greece, such as Plato, Atlas, and Archimedes. Toward the middle in Octants IV, V, and VI craters were denominated based on names from the ancient Roman Empire, such as Julius Caesar, Tacitus, and Taruntius. Toward the southern half of the lunar cartograph (map) craters were denominated in honor of scholars, writers, and philosophers of medieval Europe and Arabic regions.

The outer extremes of Octants V, VI, and VII, and all of Octant VIII were denominated in honor of contemporaries of Giambattista Riccioli. Features of Octant VIII were also denominated in honor of Copernicus, Kepler, and Galileo. These persons were "banished" to it far from the "ancients," as a gesture to the Catholic Church. Many craters around the Mare Nectaris were denominated in honor of Catholic saints pursuant to the nomenclature of Van Langren. All of them were, however, connected in some mode with astronomy. Later cartographs (maps) removed the "St." from their toponyms.

The lunar nomenclature of Giambattista Riccioli was widely used after the publication of his Almagestum Novum, and many of its toponyms are used. The system was scientifically inclusive and was considered eloquent and poetic in style, and it appealed widely to his contemporaries. It was also readily extensible with new toponyms for additional features. It replaced the nomenclature of Van Langren and Hevelius.

Later astronomers and lunar cartographers augmented the nomenclature with additional toponyms. The most notable among these contributors was Johann H. Schröter, who published a very detailed cartograph (map) of the Moon in 1791 titled the Selenotopografisches Fragmenten. Schröter's adoption of Riccioli's nomenclature perpetuated it as the universally standard lunar nomenclature. In 1935, a vote of the International Astronomical Union (IAU) established the lunar nomenclature of Riccioli, which included 600 lunar toponyms, as universally official and doctrinal.

In the 1960s, The IAU expanded and updated the lunar nomenclature, but new toponyms were limited to toponyms honoring deceased scientists. After Soviet spacecraft photographed the far side of the Moon, many of the newly discovered features were denominated in honor of Soviet scientists and engineers. The IAU assigned all subsequent new lunar toponyms. Some craters were denominated in honor of space explorers.

=== Satellite craters ===
Johann H. Mädler authored the nomenclature for satellite craters. The subsidiary craters surrounding a major crater were identified by a letter. These subsidiary craters were usually smaller than the crater with which they were associated, with some exceptions. The craters could be assigned letters "A" to "Z," with "I" omitted. Because the great majority of the toponyms of craters were masculine, the major craters were generically denominated patronymic craters.

The assignment of the letters to satellite craters was originally somewhat haphazard. Letters were typically assigned to craters in order of significance rather than location. Precedence depended on the angle of illumination from the Sun at the time of the telescopic observation, which could change during the lunar day. In many cases the assignments were seemingly random. In a number of cases the satellite crater was located closer to a major crater with which it was not associated.

To identify the patronymic crater, Mädler placed the identifying letter to the side of the midpoint of the feature that was closest to the associated major crater. This also had the advantage of permitting omission of the toponyms of the major craters from the cartographs (maps) when their subsidiary features were labelled.

Over time, lunar observers assigned many of the satellite craters an eponym. The International Astronomical Union (IAU) assumed authority to denominate lunar features in 1919. The commission for denominating these features formally adopted the convention of using capital Roman letters to identify craters and valleys.

When suitable maps of the far side of the Moon became available by 1966, Ewen Whitaker denominated satellite features based on the angle of their location relative to the major crater with which they were associated. A satellite crater located due north of the major crater was identified as "Z". The full 360° circle around the major crater was then subdivided evenly into 24 parts, like a 24-hour clock. Each "hour" angle, running clockwise, was assigned a letter, beginning with "A" at 1 o'clock. The letters "I" and "O" were omitted, resulting in only 24 letters. Thus a crater due south of its major crater was identified as "M".

== Reference elevation ==
The Moon lacks any mean sea level to be used as vertical datum. The USGS's Lunar Orbiter Laser Altimeter (LOLA), an instrument on NASA's Lunar Reconnaissance Orbiter (LRO), employs a digital elevation model (DEM) that uses the nominal lunar radius of 1,737.4 km (1,079.6 mi). The selenoid, the geoid for the Moon, has been measured gravimetrically by the GRAIL twin satellites.

== Historical lunar maps ==
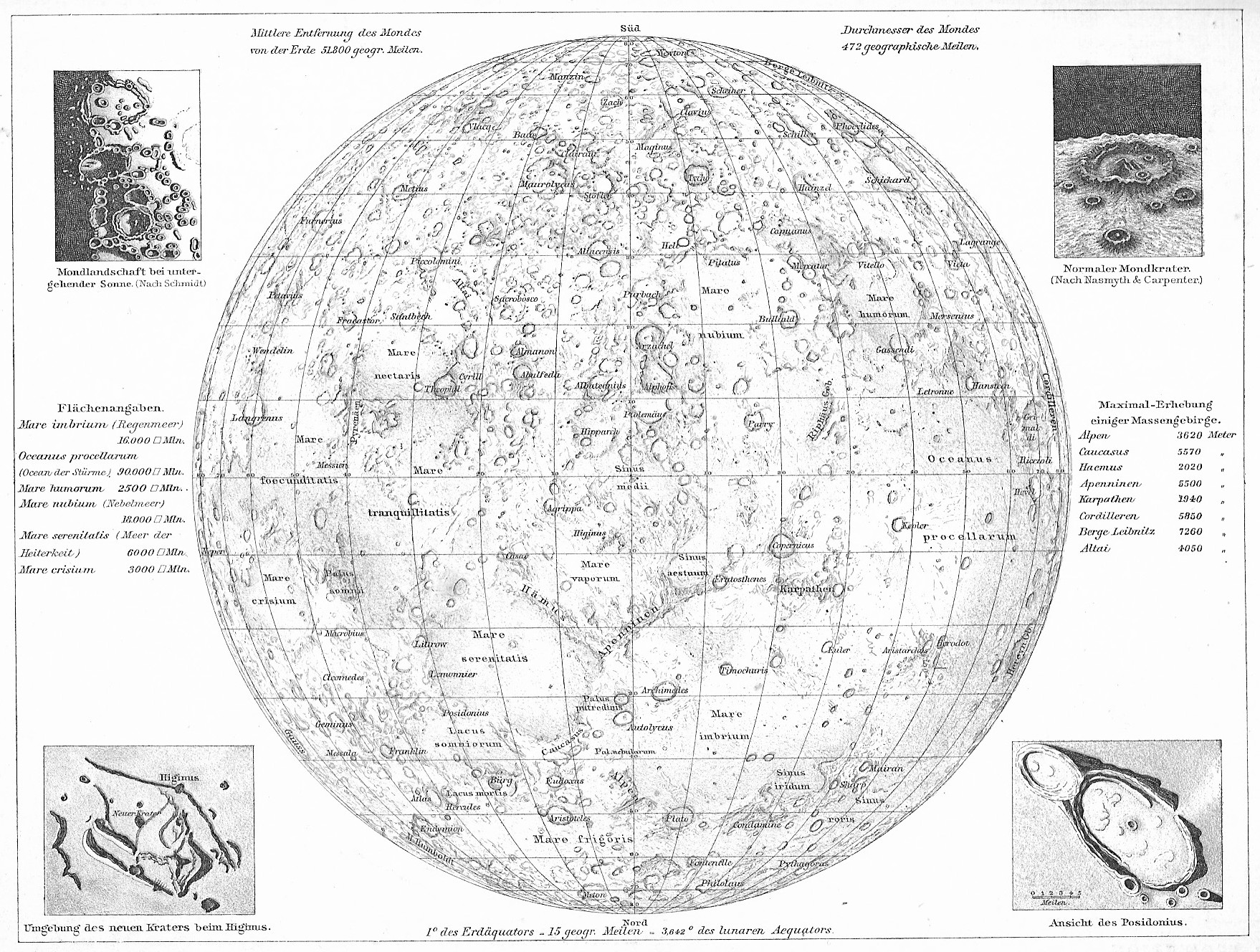
An 1881 map of the Moon from the Andrees Allgemeiner Handatlas by Richard Andree

The following historically notable lunar maps and atlases are arranged in chronological order by publication date.

- Michael van Langren, engraved map, 1645.
- Johannes Hevelius, Selenographia, 1647.
- Giovanni Battista Riccioli and Francesco Maria Grimaldi, Almagestum novum, 1651.
- Giovanni Domenico Cassini, engraved map, 1679 (reprinted in 1787).
- Tobias Mayer, engraved map, 1749, published in 1775.
- Johann Hieronymus Schröter, Selenotopografisches Fragmenten, 1st volume 1791, 2nd volume 1802.
- John Russell, engraved images, 1805.
- Wilhelm Lohrmann, Topographie der sichtbaren Mondoberflaeche, Leipzig, 1824.
- Wilhelm Beer and Johann Heinrich Mädler, Mappa Selenographica totam Lunae hemisphaeram visibilem complectens, Berlin, 1834-36.
- Edmund Neison, The Moon, London, 1876.
- Julius Schmidt, Charte der Gebirge des Mondes, Berlin, 1878.
- Thomas Gwyn Elger, The Moon, London, 1895.
- Johann Krieger, Mond-Atlas, 1898. Two additional volumes were published posthumously in 1912 by the Vienna Academy of Sciences.
- Walter Goodacre, Map of the Moon, London, 1910.
- Mary A. Blagg and Karl Müller, Named Lunar Formations, 2 volumes, London, 1935.
- Philipp Fauth, Unser Mond, Bremen, 1936.
- Hugh P. Wilkins, 300-inch Moon map, 1951.
- Gerard Kuiper et al., Photographic Lunar Atlas, Chicago, 1960.
- Ewen A. Whitaker et al., Rectified Lunar Atlas, Tucson, 1963.
- Hermann Fauth and Philipp Fauth (posthumously), Mondatlas, 1964.
- Gerard Kuiper et al., System of Lunar Craters, 1966.
- Yu I. Efremov et al., Atlas Obratnoi Storony Luny, Moscow, 1967–1975.
- NASA, Lunar Topographic Orthophotomaps, 1978.
- Antonín Rükl, Atlas of the Moon, 2004.

== Galleries ==
The Moon

Lunar near side

Lunar far side

Lunar north pole

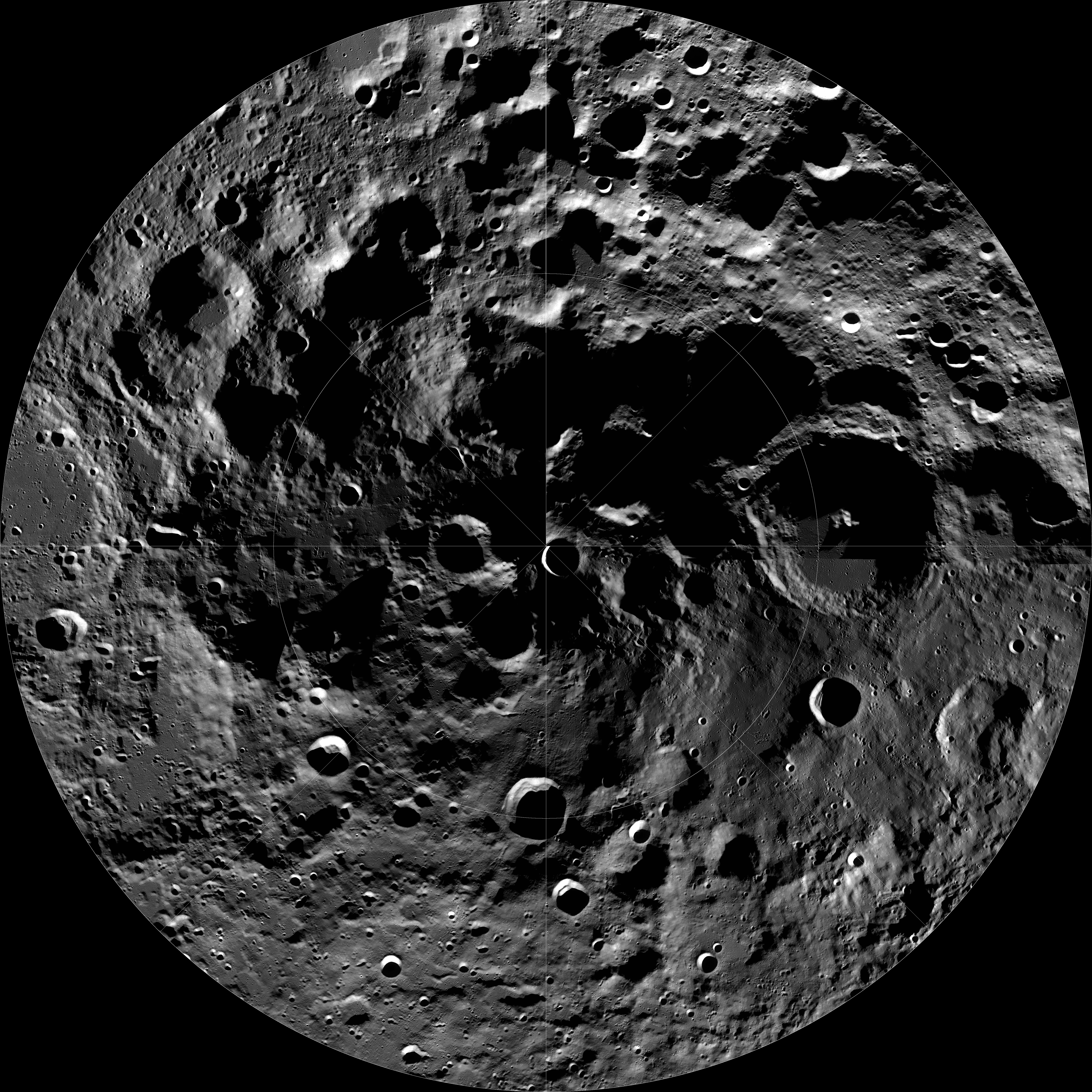
Lunar south pole

Moon – Oceanus Procellarum ("Ocean of Storms")

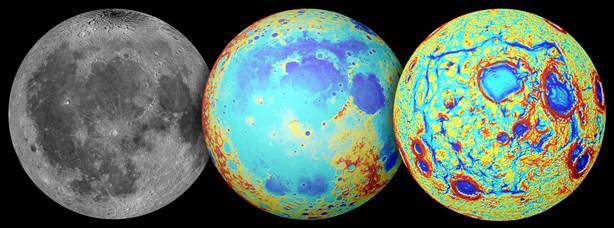
Ancient rift valleys – rectangular structure (visible – topography – GRAIL gravity gradients) (October 1, 2014).

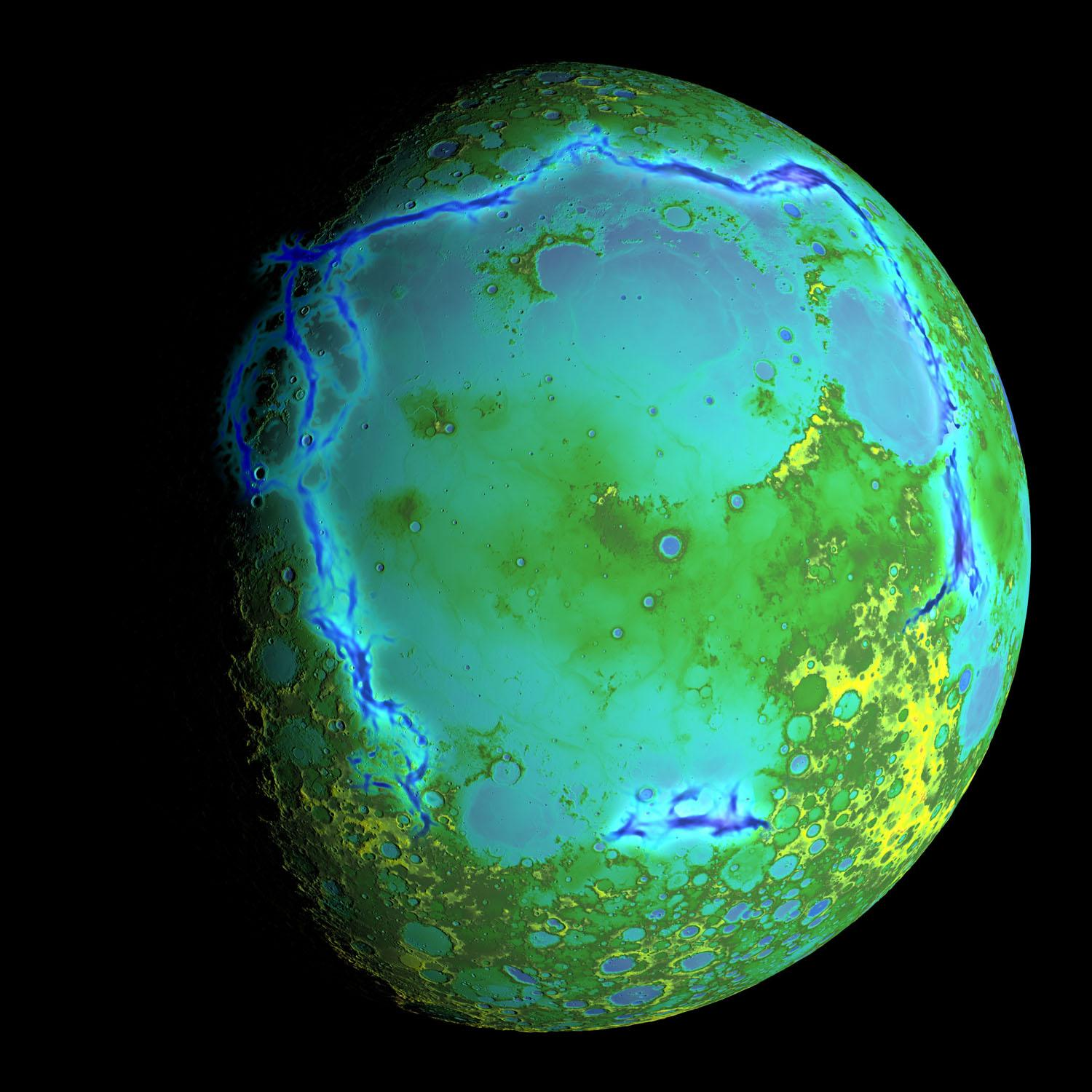
Ancient rift valleys – context.

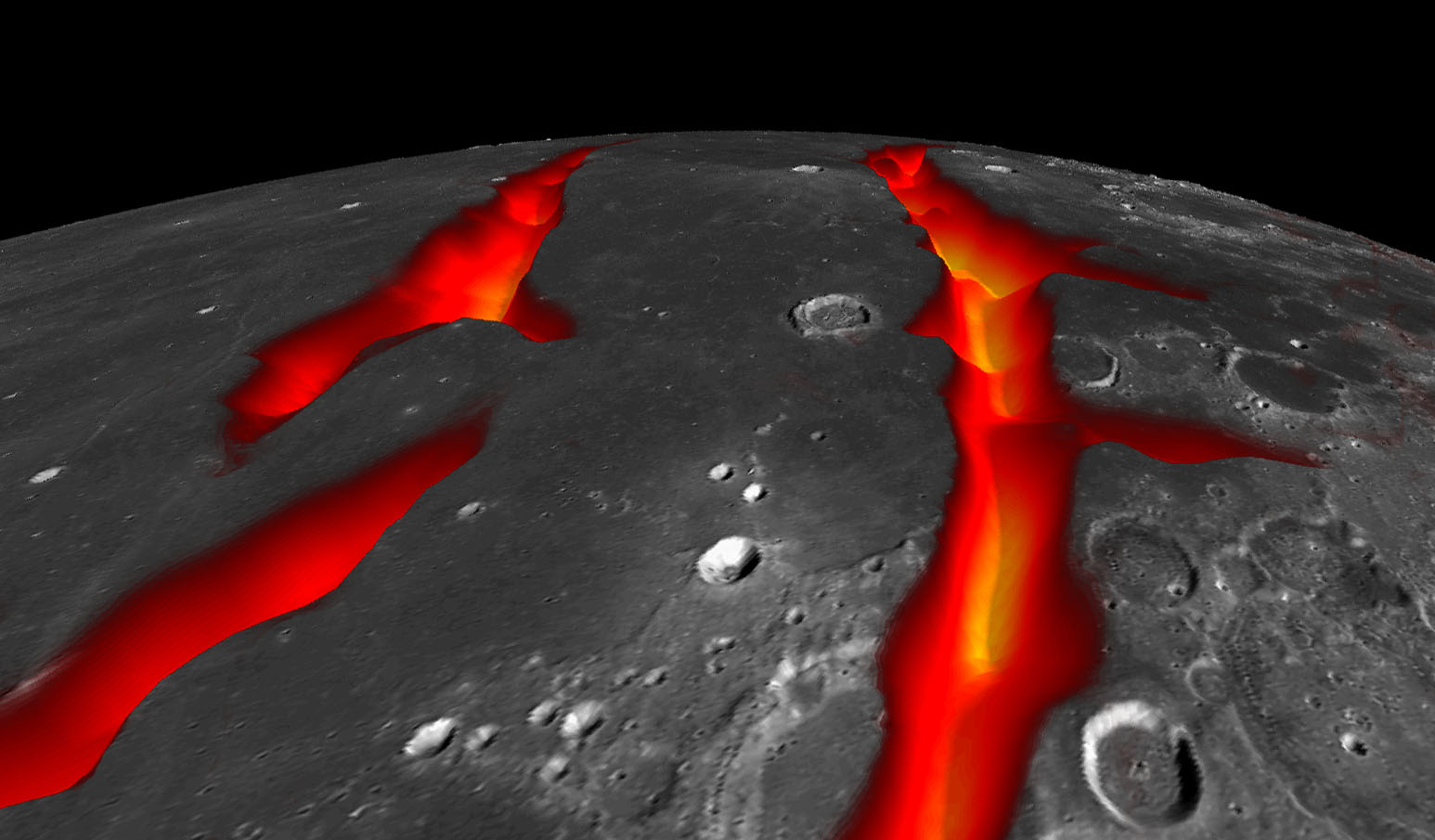
Ancient rift valleys – closeup (artist's concept).

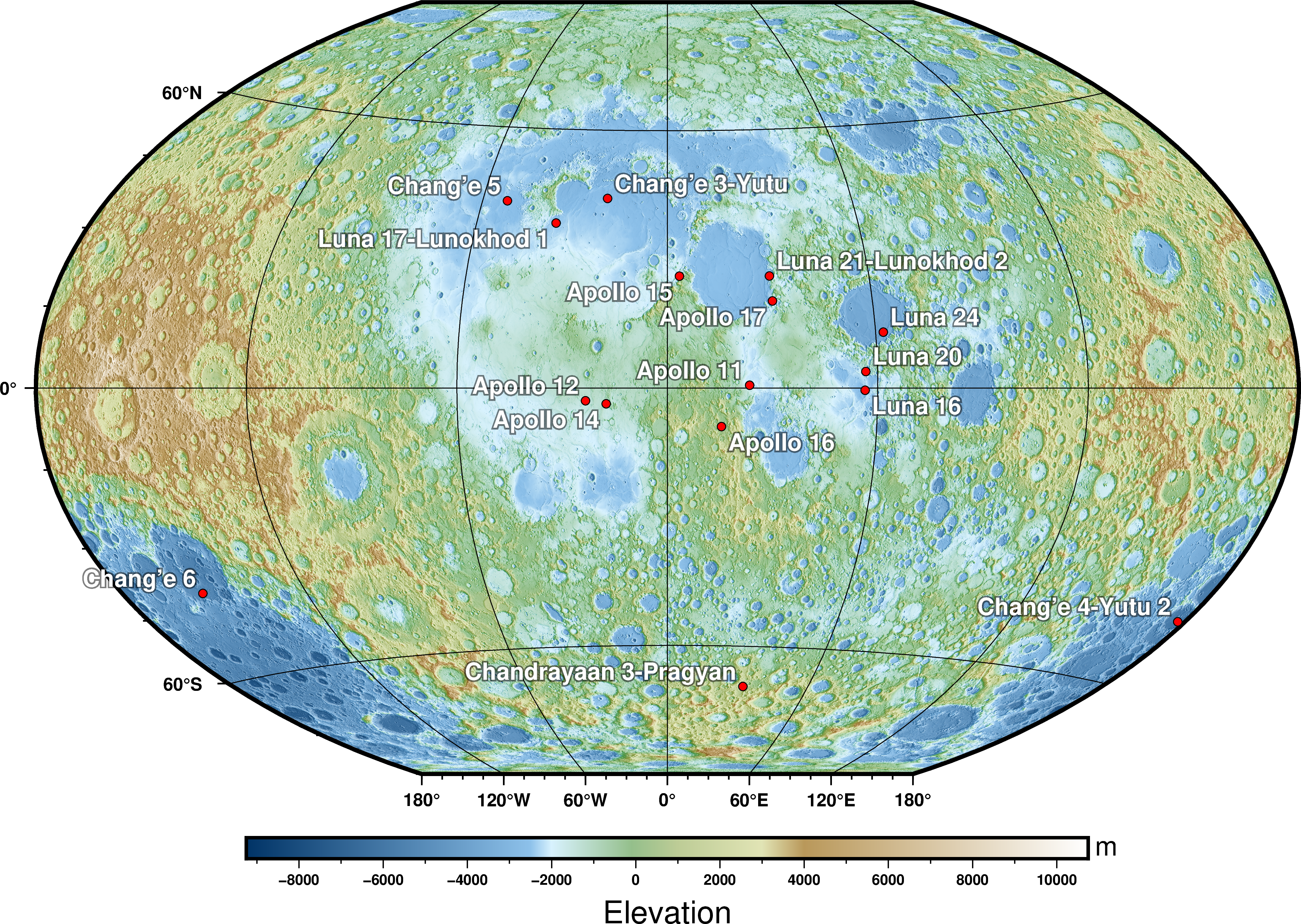
A topographic map of the Moon, with landing sites.

== See also ==
- Google Earth – 3D Internet global map program
- Gravitation of the Moon
- Grazing lunar occultation
- Planetary nomenclature – System of uniquely identifying features on the surface of a planet or natural satellite
- Selenographic coordinate system – Coordinate system used on the Moon
- List of craters on the Moon
- List of mountains on the Moon – Lunar peaks
- List of plains on the Moon
- List of valleys on the Moon
