= Iota Trianguli =

Quadruple star system in the constellation Triangulum

- Location of ι Trianguli (circled)

Observation data Epoch J2000.0 Equinox ICRS
- Constellation: Triangulum
- A
- Right ascension: 02^{h} 12^{m} 22.2797^{s}
- Declination: +30° 18′ 11.053″
- Apparent magnitude (V): 5.32
- B
- Right ascension: 02^{h} 12^{m} 22.5637^{s}
- Declination: +30° 18′ 12.342″
- Apparent magnitude (V): 6.83

Characteristics

A
- Spectral type: G0 III + G5 III
- B−V color index: +0.856
- Variable type: ellipsoidal + RS CVn

B
- Spectral type: F5V + ?
- B−V color index: +0.515

Astrometry

A
Proper motion (μ)	RA: −64.350 mas/yr Dec.: −59.503 mas/yr
Parallax (π)	11.3011±0.1024 mas
Distance	289 ± 3 ly (88.5 ± 0.8 pc)

B
Proper motion (μ)	RA: −64.414 mas/yr Dec.: −49.913 mas/yr
Parallax (π)	12.7375±0.5496 mas
Distance	260 ± 10 ly (79 ± 3 pc)
Absolute magnitude (M_{V})	+0.20

Orbit
Primary	Aa
Name	Ab
Period (P)	14.73018 days
Semi-major axis (a)	0.002″
Eccentricity (e)	0.0035
Inclination (i)	55 – 58°
Semi-amplitude (K_{1}) (primary)	54.84 km/s
Semi-amplitude (K_{2}) (secondary)	56.39 km/s

Orbit
Primary	Ba
Name	Bb
Period (P)	2.2365 days
Eccentricity (e)	0
Semi-amplitude (K_{1}) (primary)	95.4 km/s
Semi-amplitude (K_{2}) (secondary)	101.0 km/s

Details

Aa
Mass	2.50 M_{☉}
Radius	4.0 R_{☉}
Luminosity	61.7 L_{☉}
Temperature	4,932 K
Rotational velocity (v sin i)	32.9 km/s

Ab
Mass	2.43 M_{☉}
Radius	1.5 R_{☉}
Luminosity	10.0 L_{☉}
Temperature	6,486 K
Rotational velocity (v sin i)	3.0 km/s

Ba
Mass	1.58 M_{☉}

Bb
Mass	1.56 M_{☉}

Other designations
- Triminus, ι Tri, 6 Tri, TZ Tri, BD+29°371, HD 13480, HIP 10280, HR 642, SAO 55347, WDS J02124+3018

Database references
SIMBAD	data

Iota Trianguli, formally named Triminus, is a quadruple star system in constellation of Triangulum. The pair have a combined apparent magnitude of 4.95 and are approximately 290 light-years from Earth.

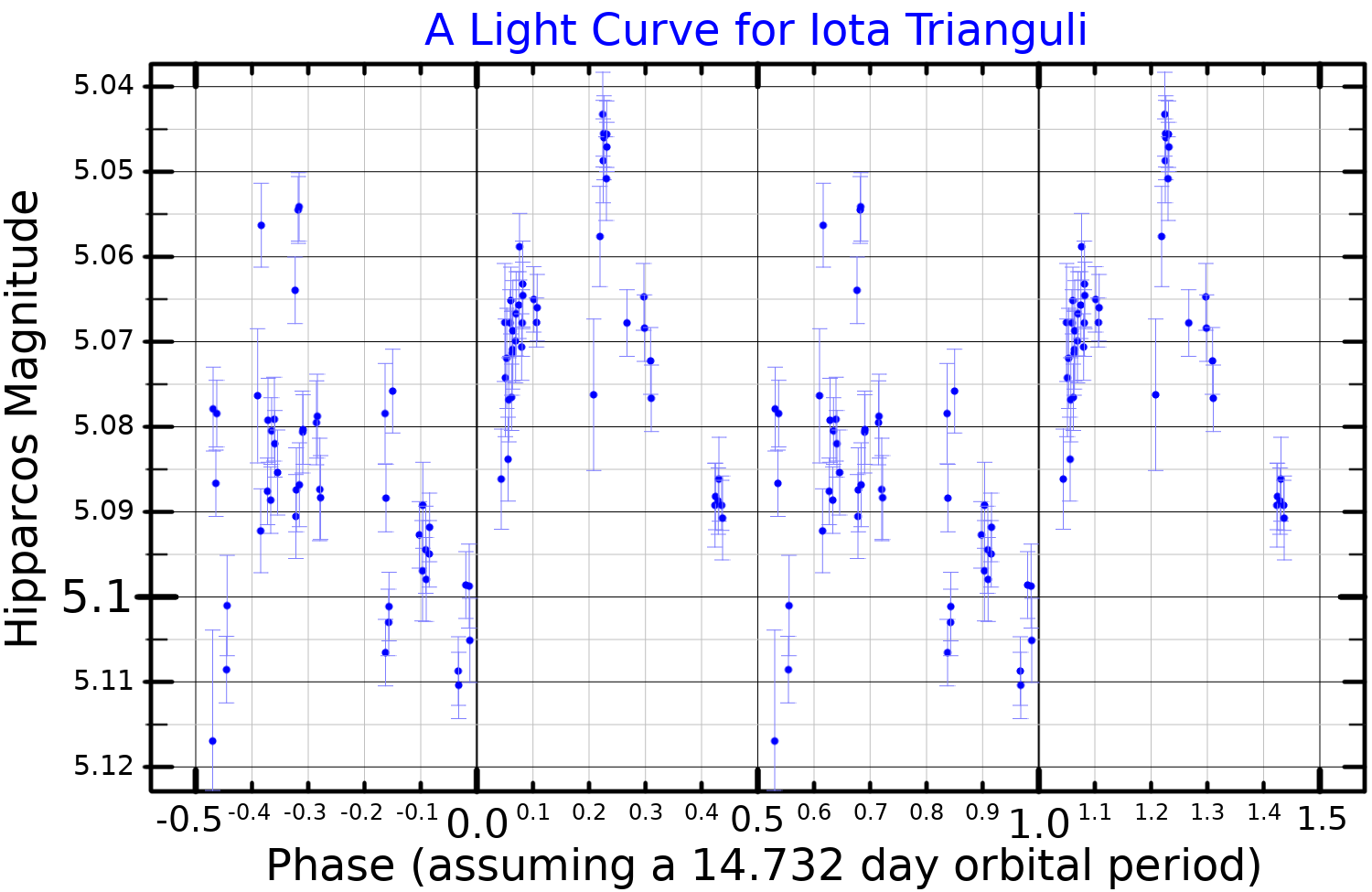
A light curve for Iota Trianguli, plotted from Hipparcos data

Both components of ι Trianguli are spectroscopic binaries and the brighter pair is variable. It was discovered to be a variable star in 1980, by Douglas S. Hall et al. It has been given the variable star designation TZ Trianguli. The variations are due to the ellipsoidal shape of the stars as they rotate, and also it is classified as an RS Canum Venaticorum variable.

== Nomenclature ==
Iota Trianguli, latinized from ι Trianguli, is the star's Bayer designation; it is also known by the Flamsteed designation 6 Trianguli. Together with 10 Trianguli and 12 Trianguli, it formed part of the obsolete constellation Triangulum Minus.

The Latin name "Triminus" is composed of the IAU abbreviation of "Tri" for Triangulum and "Minus" for Triangulum Minus, or the lesser triangle made by Johannes Hevelius. The IAU Working Group on Star Names approved the name Triminus for Iota Trianguli Aa on 25 August 2025 and it is now so entered in the IAU Catalog of Star Names.
