= Mons Maenalus =

Former constellation

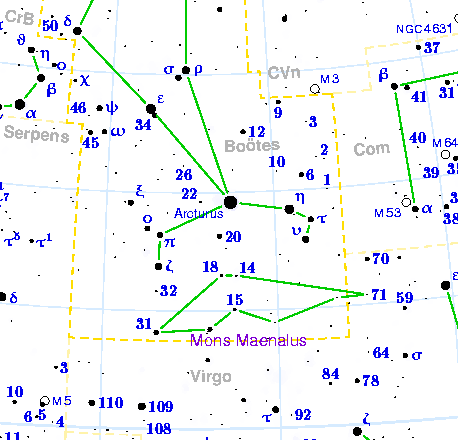
Map of Mons Maenalus

Mons Maenalus (Latin for Mount Maenalus) was a constellation created by Johannes Hevelius in 1687. It was located between the constellations of Boötes and Virgo, and depicts a mountain in Greece that the herdsman is stepping upon. It was increasingly considered obsolete by the latter half of the 19th century.

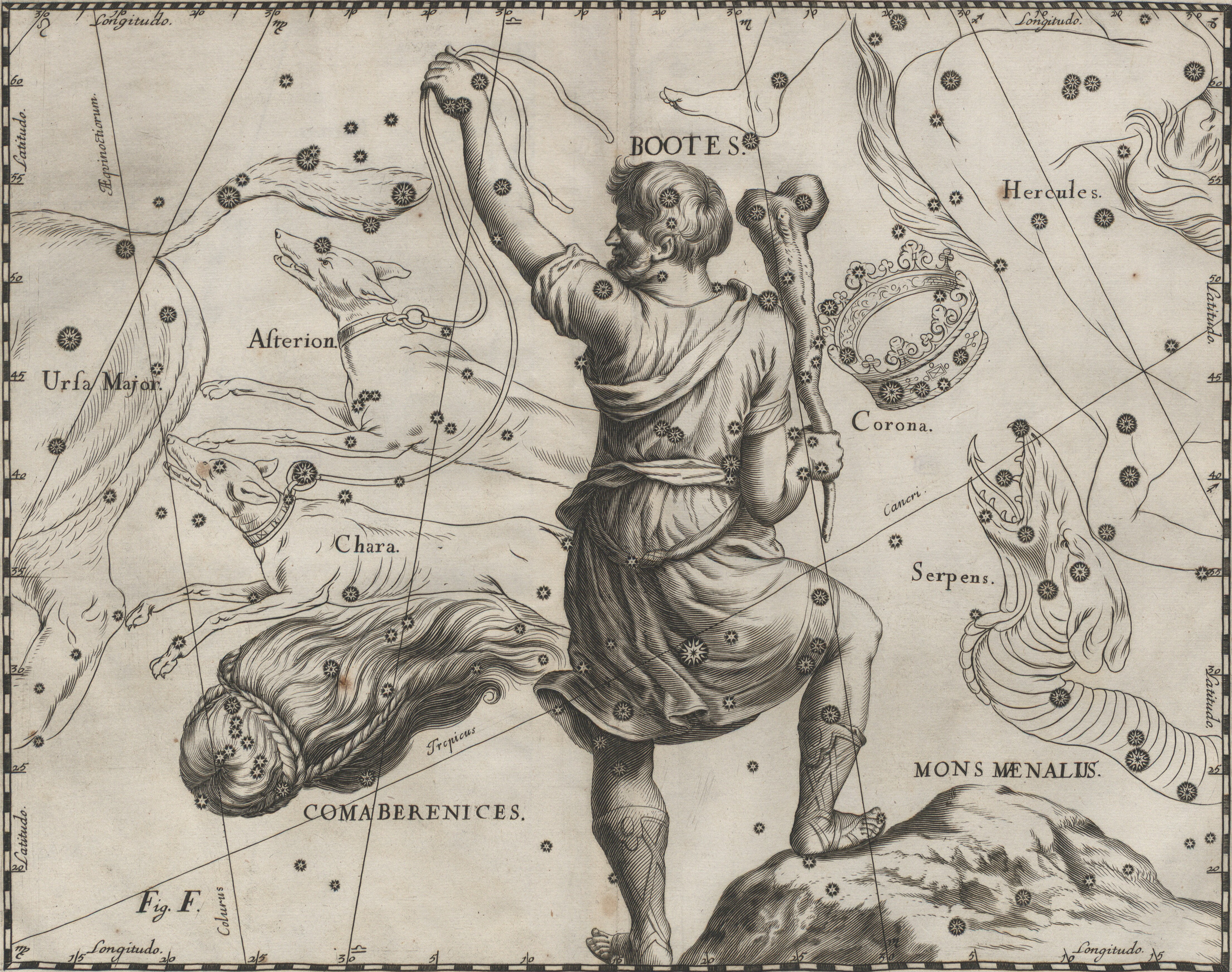
Plate from Hevelius's Firmamentum Sobiescianum with Mons Mænalus in the lower right, under Boötes. Note that Hevelius's atlas is reversed horizontally, as on a celestial globe.

== Stars ==
In Hevelius’s catalogue, the constellation was made from unformed stars in northern Virgo and southern Boötes, even extending into Serpens Caput. The brightest star, 109 Virginis is a blue star with an apparent magnitude of 3.72. Johann Bode shrunk the constellation, restricting it to southern Boötes. It wasn’t considered a separate constellation, but an asterism within Boötes. The new brightest star, 31 Boötis, was only of magnitude 4.86, which Bode designated with the letter z. Other stars were 14, 15, 18 Boötis. In 2026, the IAU Working Group on Star Names adopted the name Maenalus for 109 Virginis, after the obsolete constellation.

== See also ==
- Former constellations
