= 12 Trianguli =

Star in the constellation Triangulum

- Location of 12 Trianguli (circled)

Observation data Epoch J2000.0 Equinox ICRS
- Constellation: Triangulum
- Right ascension: 02^{h} 28^{m} 09.980^{s}
- Declination: +29° 40′ 09.59″
- Apparent magnitude (V): 5.37

Characteristics
- Spectral type: F0 III
- B−V color index: +0.29

Astrometry
Radial velocity (R_{v})	−24.8±2.8 km/s
Proper motion (μ)	RA: −15.632 mas/yr Dec.: −86.097 mas/yr
Parallax (π)	20.4105±0.0942 mas
Distance	159.8 ± 0.7 ly (49.0 ± 0.2 pc)

Details
Mass	1.6 M_{☉}
Luminosity	14 L_{☉}
Surface gravity (log g)	3.79 cgs
Temperature	7,199 K
Metallicity [Fe/H]	0.27 dex
Rotational velocity (v sin i)	85 km/s
Age	2.19 Gyr

Other designations
- 12 Trianguli, AG+29°296, BD+29°417, GC 2956, HD 15257, HIP 11486, HR 717, SAO 75382

Database references
SIMBAD	data

12 Trianguli is a solitary star located in the northern constellation Triangulum, with an apparent magnitude of 5.37, making it faintly visible to the naked eye under ideal conditions. The star is situated 160 light years away but is approaching with a heliocentric radial velocity of −24.8 km/s. It is calculated to be about 2.19 Gyr old with a stellar classification of F0 III, making it an F-type giant. It has 1.6 times the mass of the Sun and shines at 14 times the luminosity of the Sun from its photosphere at an effective temperature of 7,199 K.

It was once designated c Trianguli by John Flamsteed and was included in his Atlas Coelestis, but the designation is now dropped.

Together with ι Trianguli and 10 Trianguli, it forms part of the obsolete Triangulum Minus.
