= Elisabeth Hevelius =

Astronomer from Danzig (1647–1693)

Elisabeth Catherina Koopmann-Hevelius
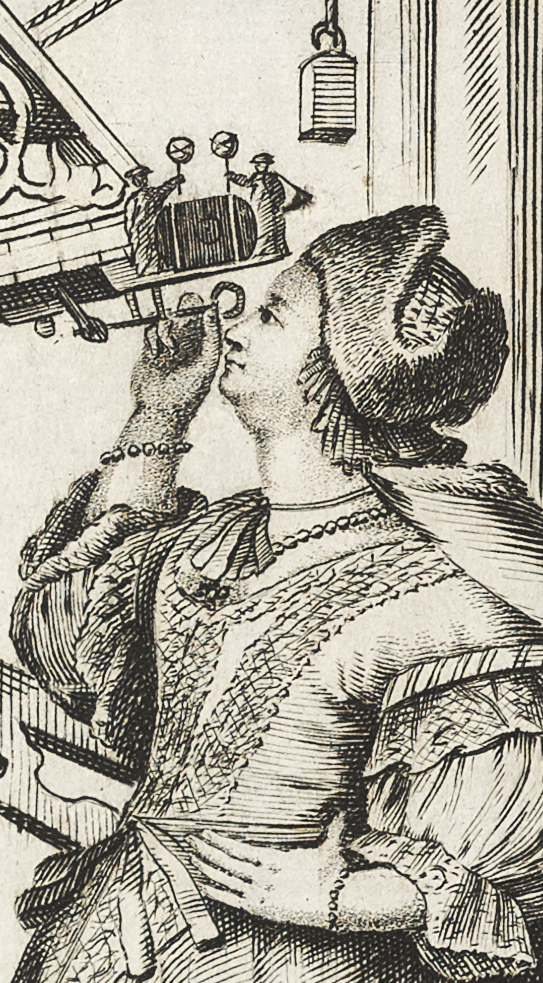
- Born: 17 January 1647; Danzig, Polish–Lithuanian Commonwealth
- Died: 22 December 1693 (aged 46); Danzig, Polish–Lithuanian Commonwealth
- Occupation: Astronomer
- Spouse: Johannes Hevelius

Elisabeth Catherina Koopmann-Hevelius (Polish: Elżbieta Heweliusz; 17 January 1647 – 22 December 1693) is considered one of the first female astronomers. She contributed to improve and published Prodromus Astronomiae, a comprehensive star catalog by her husband Johannes Hevelius in Danzig. Her contribution to astronomy was recognized posthumously, including the naming of a crater on planet Venus and an asteroid after her.

== Early life and education ==
Elisabeth Catherina Koopmann was born on 17 January 1647 in Danzig, now Gdańsk in Poland. At the time, Danzig was a mostly German-speaking city in the Polish–Lithuanian Commonwealth.

Elisabeth grew up in a wealthy merchant family. Her mother was Joanna Mennings (or Menninx; 1602–1679), and her father, Nicholas Koopman (1601–1672), was a successful merchant.

She received a broad education that included languages, Latin and the natural sciences. Elisabeth was fascinated by astronomy from childhood, and her interest led her to approach Johannes Hevelius, a prominent astronomer who lived in Danzig. He promised to show her the night sky when she was older.

== Marriage ==
In 1662, at age fifteen, Koopmann returned to Johannes Hevelius and reminded him of his earlier promise to show her the night sky. Koopmann and Hevelius shared an interest in astronomy and married in Danzig on 3 February 1663, shortly after Koopmann's sixteenth birthday. He was thirty-six years older than her and had been widowed eleven months earlier.

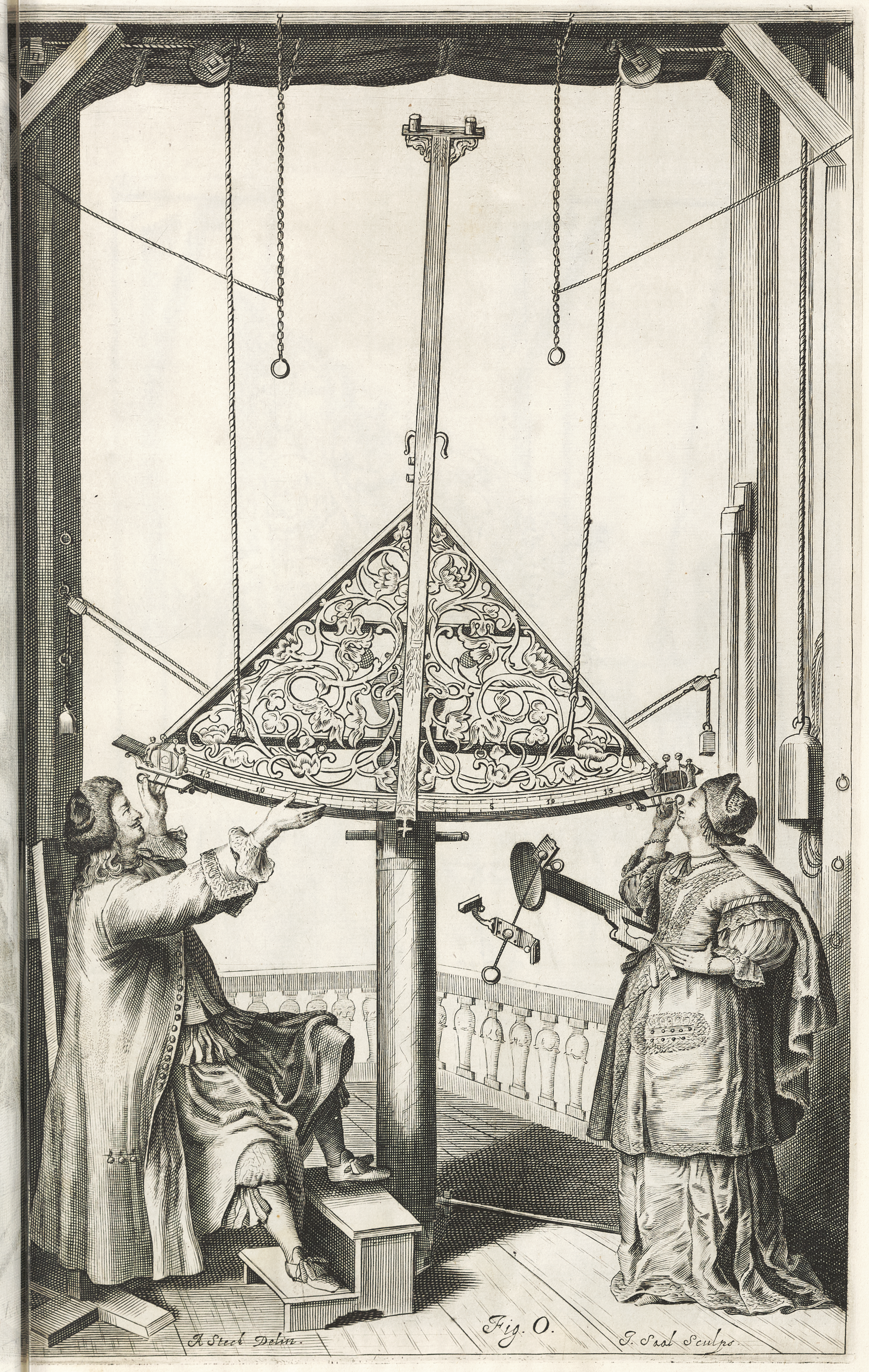
Johannes and Elisabeth Hevelius observing the sky with a brass octant (1673).

== Career ==
After marrying Hevelius in 1663, Koopmann began working at his observatory in Danzig, which had been built across the roofs of three connected houses. In 1664, when she was about 17, she began regularly assisting with astronomical observations and became Hevelius's observing partner. Their work included measuring the positions of stars using large sextants and octants. These instruments required at least two people to operate, with another assistant sometimes needed to move the largest equipment.

Koopmann continued observing while raising their family. Between 1664 and 1672, she gave birth to four children; their son died in infancy, while their three daughters survived childhood. Results from observations made by the couple appeared in Hevelius's Cometographia in 1668. Five years later, in 1673, Hevelius published the first volume of Machina Coelestis, a work describing his astronomical instruments and methods. Two engravings show Koopmann and Hevelius observing together, including one in which they operate a large brass octant.

By the late 1670s, Koopmann had been working as an observer for more than a decade. From 26 May to 18 July 1679, the English astronomer Edmond Halley stayed in Danzig to investigate the accuracy of the Heveliuses' observations. At the time, astronomers were debating whether accurate measurements could be made with traditional naked-eye instruments rather than instruments fitted with telescopic sights. Halley observed Johannes and Elisabeth at work and found their measurements to be accurate.

On 26 September 1679, about two months after Halley's visit ended, a fire destroyed the Heveliuses' observatory and much of its equipment, including their astronomical instruments, library and printing facilities. Some books and astronomical records survived, and the Heveliuses rebuilt the observatory and resumed their work.

== Publications ==
After her Hevelius died in 1687, Koopmann prepared three of his partly finished astronomy books for publication. In November, she asked the Royal Society, a scientific organization in London, for help editing the books, but apparently received none. She published the first book, Stellarum Fixarum, later that year.

In 1690, Koopmann published the two remaining books. Firmamentum Sobiescianum sive Uranographia was a celestial atlas containing 56 star charts. Prodromus Astronomiae was a star catalogue of 1,564 stars. Much of the material in the three books came from observations and calculations Koopmann had made during the years she worked with her husband.

== In culture ==
The minor planet 12625 Koopman is named in her honor, as is the crater Corpman on Venus.

Koopmann's life was dramatized in the German language historical novel Die Sternjägerin ('The Star Huntress', 2006).

The Oxford Polish Association runs an educational ‘’Hevelius Project’’ which is named after Johannes and Elisabeth.

== See also ==
- List of Poles
- Maria Cunitz
