= Triangulum Minus =

Former constellation

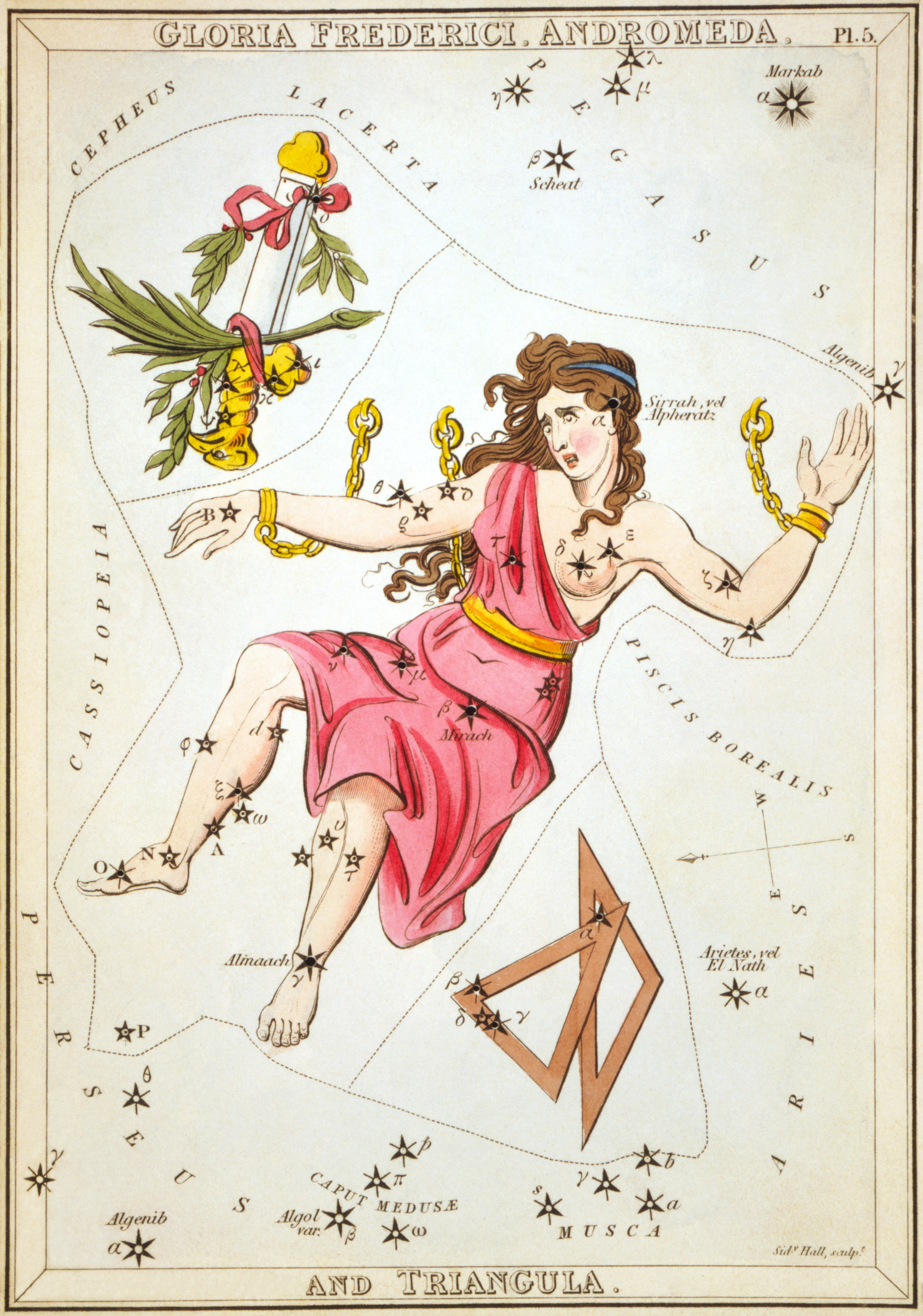
Triangula, the pair of triangles, can be seen in this plate from Urania's Mirror. Triangulum Minus is the one on the right, but the stars that define it are too faint to be included on this chart.

Triangulum Minus (Latin for the Smaller Triangle) was a constellation created by Johannes Hevelius. Its name is sometimes wrongly written as Triangulum Minor. It was formed from the southern parts of his Triangula (plural form of Triangulum), alongside Triangulum Majus, but is no longer in use. The triangle was defined by the fifth-magnitude stars ι Trianguli (6 Tri), 10 Trianguli, and 12 Trianguli.

Also known as TZ Trianguli, ι (6) Trianguli is a multiple star system with a combined magnitude of 4.7, whose main component is a yellow giant of spectral type G5III. It was named Triminus in 2025 by the IAU Working Group on Star Names, after the obsolete constellation.

== See also ==
- Former constellations
