= 31 Boötis =

Star in the constellation Boötes

- Location of 31 Boötis (circled in red)

Observation data Epoch J2000 Equinox J2000
- Constellation: Boötes
- Right ascension: 14^{h} 41^{m} 38.75049^{s}
- Declination: +08° 09′ 42.3409″
- Apparent magnitude (V): 4.86

Characteristics
- Spectral type: G7 IIIa
- B−V color index: 0.992±0.038

Astrometry
Radial velocity (R_{v})	−16.5±1.8 km/s
Proper motion (μ)	RA: −9.589 mas/yr Dec.: +3.906 mas/yr
Parallax (π)	6.8757±0.2796 mas
Distance	470 ± 20 ly (145 ± 6 pc)
Absolute magnitude (M_{V})	−1.22

Details
Mass	3.27 M_{☉}
Radius	23.25+0.40 −0.49 R_{☉}
Luminosity	274.9±12.6 L_{☉}
Surface gravity (log g)	2.60 cgs
Temperature	4,874+53 −41 K
Metallicity [Fe/H]	−0.10 dex
Rotational velocity (v sin i)	6.5 km/s
Age	370 Myr

Other designations
- 31 Boo, NSV 6769, BD+08°2903, FK5 3163, GC 19789, HD 129312, HIP 71832, HR 5480, SAO 120601

Database references
SIMBAD	data

31 Boötis is a single star in the northern constellation of Boötes, located 470 light years from the Sun. It is visible to the naked eye as a faint, yellow-hued star with an apparent visual magnitude of 4.86. The object is moving closer to the Earth with a heliocentric radial velocity of −16.5 km/s. It was known to be part of a constellation between Virgo and Boötes named Mons Maenalus, it was also the brightest star in the constellation.

This is an evolved giant star with a stellar classification of G7 IIIa. It is a suspected variable star of unknown type, and is an X-ray source. The star is 370 million years old with 3.27 times the mass of the Sun. Having exhausted the hydrogen at its core, the star has expanded to 23 times the Sun's radius. It is radiating 275 times the luminosity of the Sun from its swollen photosphere at an effective temperature of 4,874 K.
