= Prodromus Astronomiae =

Star catalogue by Johannes Hevelius

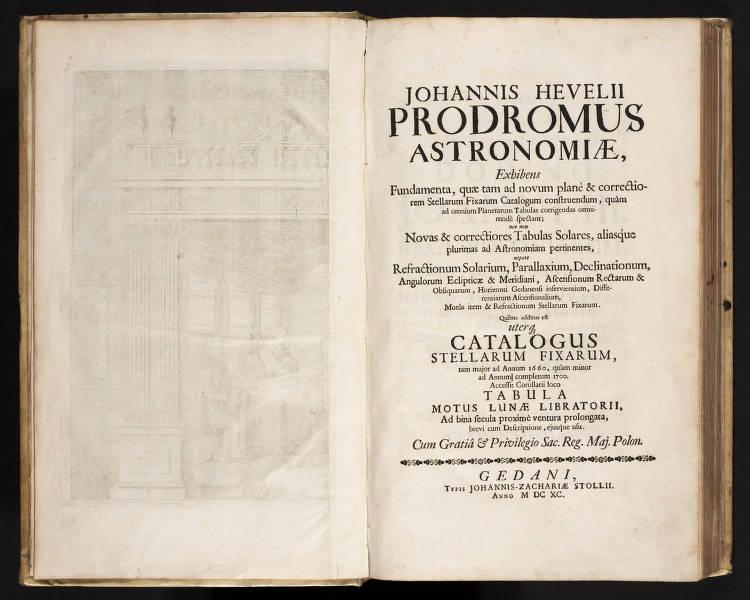
Title Page of Prodromus Astronomiae

Prodromus Astronomiae is a star catalog created by the astronomer and lunar topographer Johannes Hevelius and published posthumously by his wife and research aid Elisabeth Hevelius in 1690. The catalog consists of the location of 1,564 stars listed by constellation. It consists of three separate parts: a preface (labeled Prodromus), a star catalog (named Catalogus Stellarum), and an atlas of constellations (named Firmamentum Sobiescianum, sive Uranographia).

== Prodromus ==
Prodromus outlines the methodology and technology used in creating the star catalogue. It provides examples of the use of the sextant and quadrant by Hevelius, in tandem with known positions of the sun, in calculating each stars' longitude and latitude.

== Catalogus Stellarum ==
The written draft of the Catalogus Stellarum consists of 183 leaves, 145, alphabetized according to constellation, containing star positions. Each star had specific information recorded in columns: the reference number and magnitude found by astronomer Tycho Brahe, Hevelius' own magnitude calculation, the star's longitude and latitude by both ecliptic coordinates measured by angular distances and meridian altitudes found using Hevelius' quadrant, and the star's equatorial coordinates calculated using spherical trigonometry. The printed version was similar to the written draft, except the two columns describing a star's ecliptic coordinates were combined, and only the single best value for the star's latitude and longitude was given. Also, the printed version held more than 600 new stars and 12 new constellations not documented in the written draft, bringing its total to 1564. Although the observations of the catalog used nothing more than the astronomer's naked eye, the measurements were so precise as to be used in the making of celestial globes into the early 18th century.

== Firmamentum Sobiescianum ==
Firmamentum Sobiescianum, while technically part of the Prodromus Astronomiae, was likely published separately and in tighter circulation. Housing its own cover page and page-numbering system, the atlas consisted of two hemispheres and 54 double-page plates of 73 constellations. Both the northern and southern hemispheres were centered on an ecliptic pole, and most star locations were all based on Hevelius' own observations. Those that were not, the southern polar stars, were based on a catalog and map published in 1679 by Edmond Halley.
