= 109 Virginis =

Star in the constellation Virgo

- Chart of Virgo; 109 Virginis forms the Virgin's right foot

Observation data Epoch J2000.0 Equinox J2000.0 (ICRS)
- Constellation: Virgo
- Right ascension: 14^{h} 46^{m} 14.92345^{s}
- Declination: +01° 53′ 34.3818″
- Apparent magnitude (V): +3.72

Characteristics
- Evolutionary stage: main sequence
- Spectral type: A0 V
- B−V color index: −0.005±0.006
- Variable type: None

Astrometry
Radial velocity (R_{v})	−6.1±2.7 km/s
Proper motion (μ)	RA: −115.08 mas/yr Dec.: −20.464 mas/yr
Parallax (π)	24.2814±0.2271 mas
Distance	134 ± 1 ly (41.2 ± 0.4 pc)

Details
Mass	2.40 M_{☉}
Radius	2.57 (Note: Calculated, using the Stefan-Boltzmann law and the star's effective temperature and luminosity, with respect to the solar nominal effective temperature of 5,772 K: $$\sqrt{\biggl(\frac{5,772}{10^{3.974}}\biggr)^4 \cdot 10^{1.67}} = 2.57\ R_\odot.$$) R_{☉}
Luminosity	46.8±1.1 L_{☉}
Surface gravity (log g)	3.83±0.12 cgs
Temperature	9,420±130 K
Metallicity [Fe/H]	−0.41±0.14 dex
Rotational velocity (v sin i)	285 km/s
Age	320 Myr

Other designations
- Maenalus, 109 Vir, BD+02°2862, FK5 547, HD 130109, HIP 72220, HR 5511, SAO 120648

Database references
SIMBAD	data

109 Virginis, also named Maenalus, is a single, white-hued star in the zodiac constellation of Virgo, located some 134.5 light years away from Earth. It is the seventh-brightest member of this constellation, having an apparent visual magnitude of +3.72.

This is an A-type main-sequence star with a stellar classification of A0 V, and is a suspected chemically peculiar star. However, Abt and Morrell (1995) gave it a class of A0 IIInn, matching a giant star with "nebulous" lines. It is spinning rapidly with a projected rotational velocity of 285 km/s, which is giving the star an oblate shape with an equatorial bulge that is an estimated 31% larger than the polar radius. The star is 320 million years old with 2.4 times the mass of the Sun and about 2.57 times the Sun's radius. It is radiating 47 times the Sun's luminosity from its photosphere at an effective temperature of 9,420 K.

109 Virginis was the brightest star in the obsolete constellation Mons Maenalus, representing a mountain in the Peloponnese, Greece. The IAU Working Group on Star Names approved the name Maenalus for 109 Virginis on 15 April 2026, after the obsolete constellation.
