= Selenographia, sive Lunae descriptio =

Milestone work by Johannes Hevelius

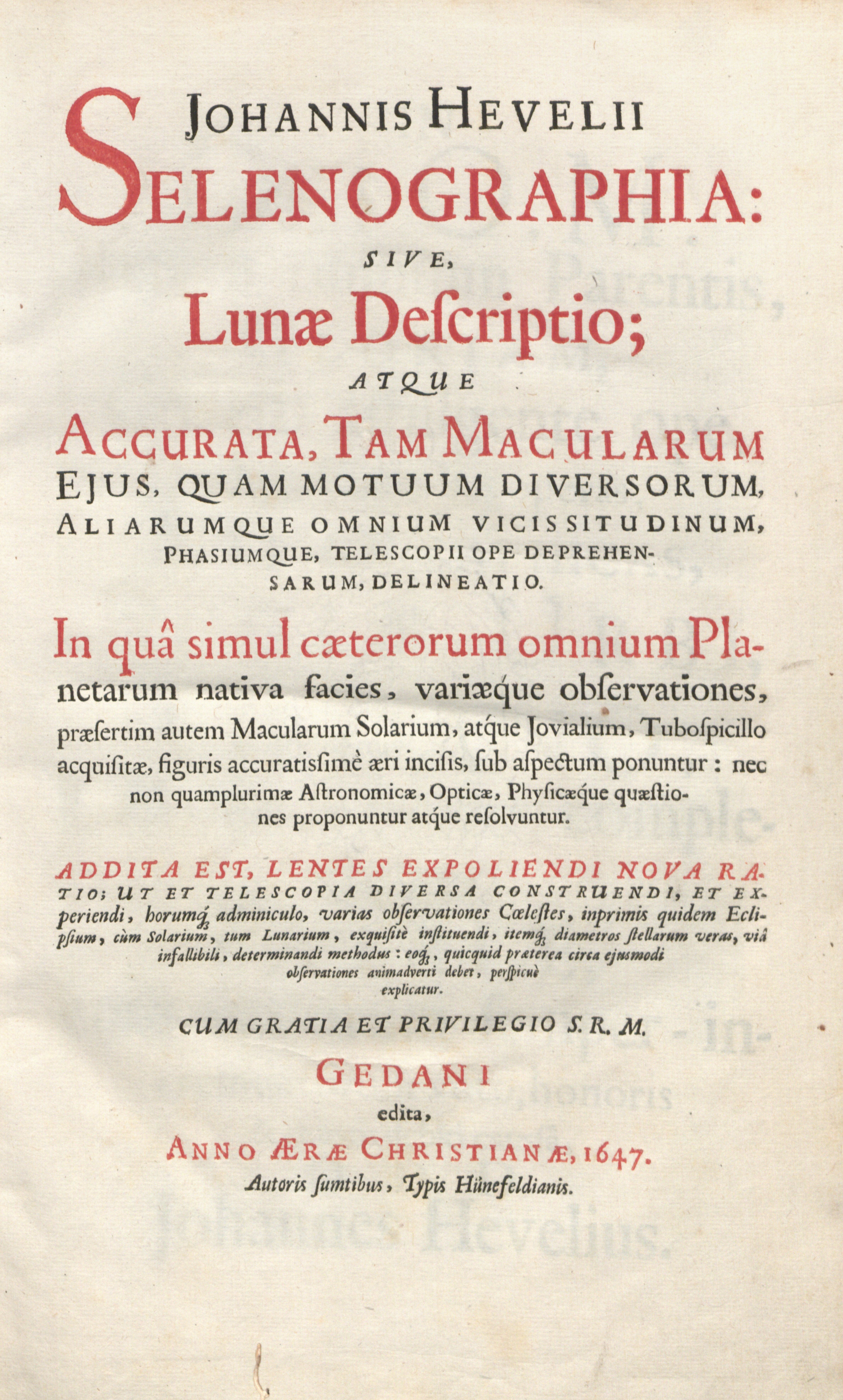
Title page

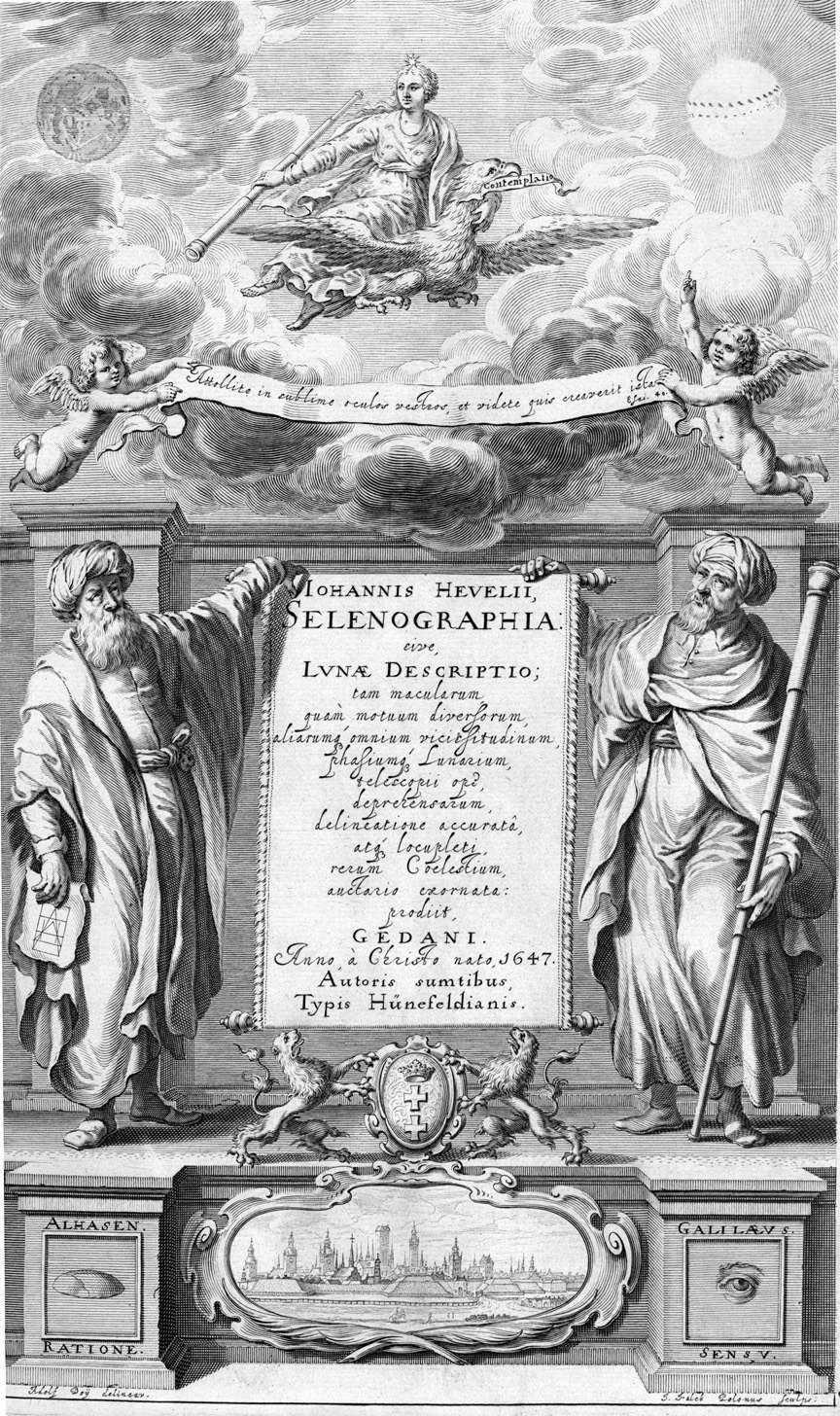
Frontispiece

Selenographia, sive Lunae descriptio (Selenography, or A Description of The Moon) was printed in 1647 and is a milestone work by the astronomer and lunar topographer Johannes Hevelius, the mayor of Danzig (Gdańsk). It includes the first detailed map of the Moon, created from Hevelius's personal observations.

== Contents and criticism of Galileo Galilei's previous efforts ==
In his treatise, Hevelius reflected on the difference between his own work and that of Galileo Galilei. Hevelius remarked that the quality of Galileo's representations of the Moon in Sidereus nuncius (1610) left something to be desired. Selenography was dedicated to King Ladislaus IV of Poland and along with Riccioli/Grimaldi's Almagestum Novum became the standard work on the Moon for over a century.

== Surviving copies ==
There are several copies that have survived, including those in the Bibliothèque nationale de France, in the library of the Polish Academy of Sciences, in the Stillman Drake Collection at the Thomas Fisher Rare Books Library at the University of Toronto, in the Gunnerus Library at the Norwegian University of Science and Technology in Trondheim,[3] and a copy once owned by Friedrich Simon Archenhold, which came to the Archenhold Observatory in Berlin in 2026.
