= NGC 592 =

H II region in the constellation Triangulum

Emission nebula
- H II region
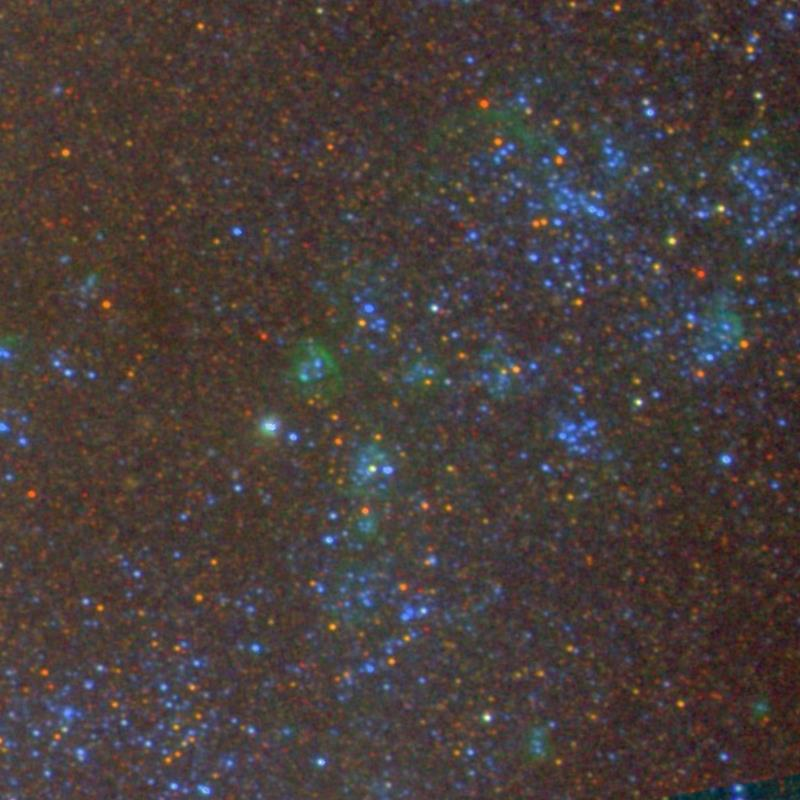
- Image of NGC 592 and local neighbours created using SDSS data

Observation data: J2000 epoch
- Right ascension: 01^{h} 33^{m} 11.69^{s}
- Declination: +30° 38′ 41.8″
- Distance: ~2.86 million ly (0.877 ± 0.222 million pc)
- Apparent magnitude (V): 13.0
- Apparent dimensions (V): 0.70 arcmins
- Constellation: Triangulum

Physical characteristics
- Radius: ~290 ly (90 pc) (estimated) ly

NGC 592 is an H II region type emission nebula located in the Triangulum galaxy (M33) and thus in the constellation of Triangulum. The nebula contains an open cluster of stars and is approximately 2.86 million light-years away from Earth.

== Observation history ==
NGC 592 was discovered by German astronomer Heinrich Louis d'Arrest on October 2, 1861. John Louis Emil Dreyer, compiler of the first New General Catalogue of Nebulae and Clusters of Stars, described NGC 592 as "faint" and "pretty large."

== Physical characteristics ==
NGC 592 is around ten times less luminous than NGC 604, a neighbouring emission nebula and one of the largest H II regions in the Local Group of galaxies. It is relatively close to the galactic centre of M33 and is located on the outer part of one of its spiral arms. The central region of NGC 592 is estimated to be 4.9 ± 0.5 million years old and have a stellar mass of 16500 ± 5200 M_{☉}_{.} Several massive stars have been discovered within NGC 592, including at least four Wolf-Rayet type stars. The nebula is also estimated to contain 8 ± 4 O- and B- type stars.

== See also ==
- Nebula
- NGC 588
- H I region
- Triangulum galaxy
- List of diffuse nebulae
