= 206 (disambiguation) =

206 may refer to:

- 206 (year)
- 206 (number)
- 206 BC
- Peugeot 206
- Bell 206
- Cessna 206
- Nokia 206
- Area code 206
- NGC 206
- UFC 206

== See also ==
- 206th (disambiguation)
