= 206th Regiment =

206th Regiment may refer to:

- 206th Field Artillery Regiment, United States
- 206th Pennsylvania Infantry Regiment, Union Army, American Civil War

== See also ==
- 206th Division (disambiguation)
- 206th Brigade (disambiguation)
- 206th (disambiguation)
