= 206th Division =

206th Division or 206th Infantry Division may refer to:

- 206th Division (1st Formation) (People's Republic of China), 1949–1950
- 206th Division (2nd Formation) (People's Republic of China), 1969–1985
- 206th Infantry Division (Wehrmacht), Germany
- 206th Coastal Division, Italy
- 206th Division (Imperial Japanese Army)
- 206th Rifle Division, Soviet Union

== See also ==
- List of military divisions by number
- 206th Brigade (disambiguation)
- 206th Regiment (disambiguation)
- 206th (disambiguation)
