= C206 =

C206 or variant, may refer to:

== Vehicles ==
- Cessna 206 (C 206), a general aviation light airplane
- SpaceX Crew Dragon Endeavour (C206), a Space X Daragon 2 crew transport space capsule

== Electronics ==
- Intel C206 platform controller hub chipset of the Cougar Point series
- Nokia C2-06, cellphone

== Other uses ==
- C206, Victoria, Australia; a road, see List of road routes in Victoria

== See also ==
- 206 (disambiguation)
- C (disambiguation)
