= NGC 595 =

Hydrogen cloud in the constellation Triangulum

Emission nebula
- H II region
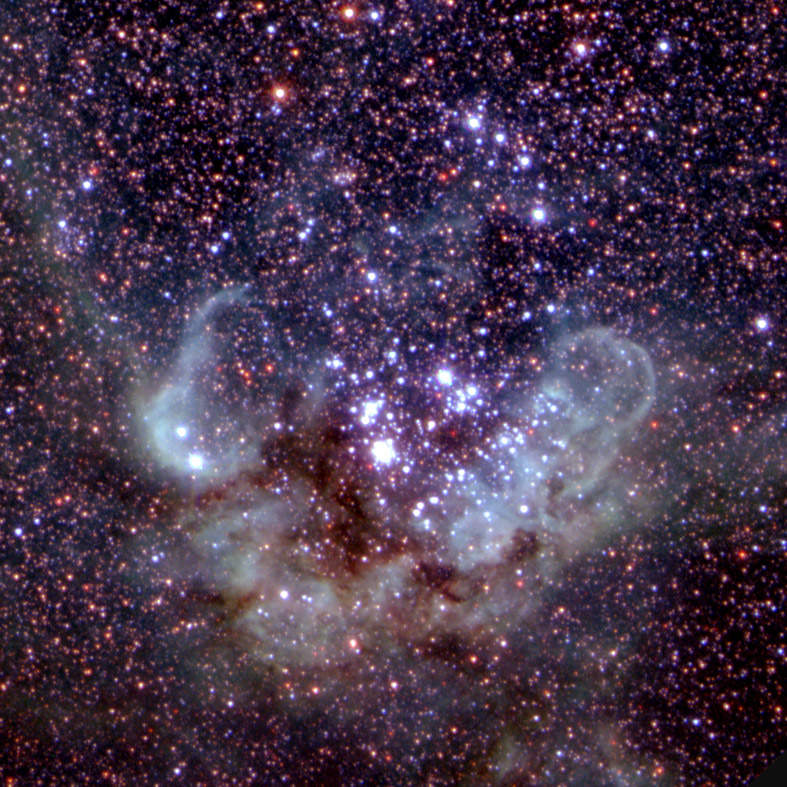
- The center of NGC 595 as seen by the Hubble Space Telescope

Observation data: J2000 epoch
- Right ascension: 01^{h} 33^{m} 33.53^{s}
- Declination: +30° 41′ 29.8″
- Distance: 3,000,000 ly (920,000 pc)
- Apparent dimensions (V): 1′
- Constellation: Triangulum

Physical characteristics
- Radius: ~440 ly (135 pc) (estimated) ly
- Designations: IRAS F01307+3025

NGC 595 is a massive H II region in the Triangulum Galaxy. It was discovered by Heinrich Ludwig d'Arrest on October 1, 1864 and is one of the biggest H II regions in the Local Group.

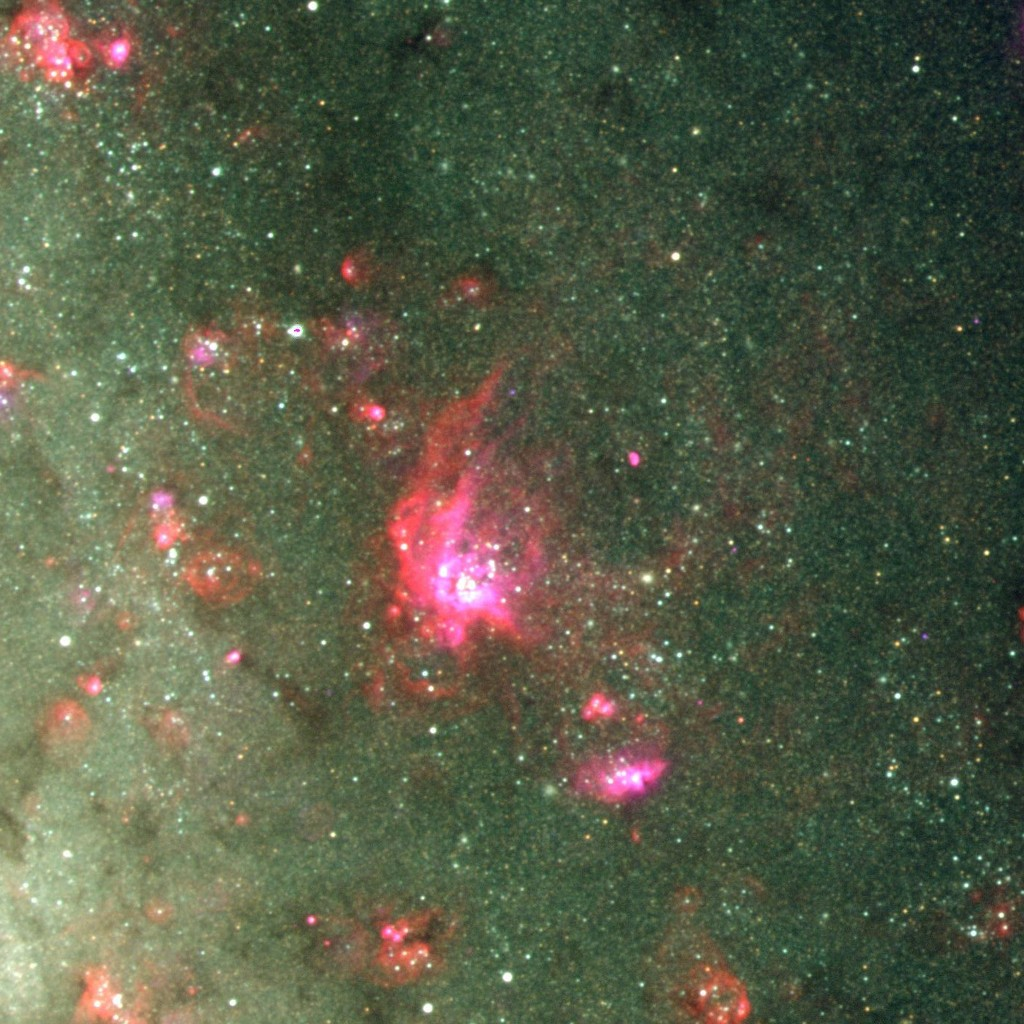
NGC 595 and the surrounding nebulae.
