= CCVI (disambiguation) =

CCVI often refers to chronic cerebrospinal venous insufficiency, a medical condition of insufficient blood flow in the central nervous system.

CCVI may also refer to:

- 206, the year corresponding to CCVI as Roman numerals
- Cordis Cardiac and Vascular Institute (CCVI), a provider of educational and clinical resources for cardiac and vascular health professionals operated by Cordis, a manufacturer of medical devices such as stents and catheters
- Abbreviation used by the Sisters of Charity of the Incarnate Word
