= Pisces Dwarf =

Irregular dwarf galaxy

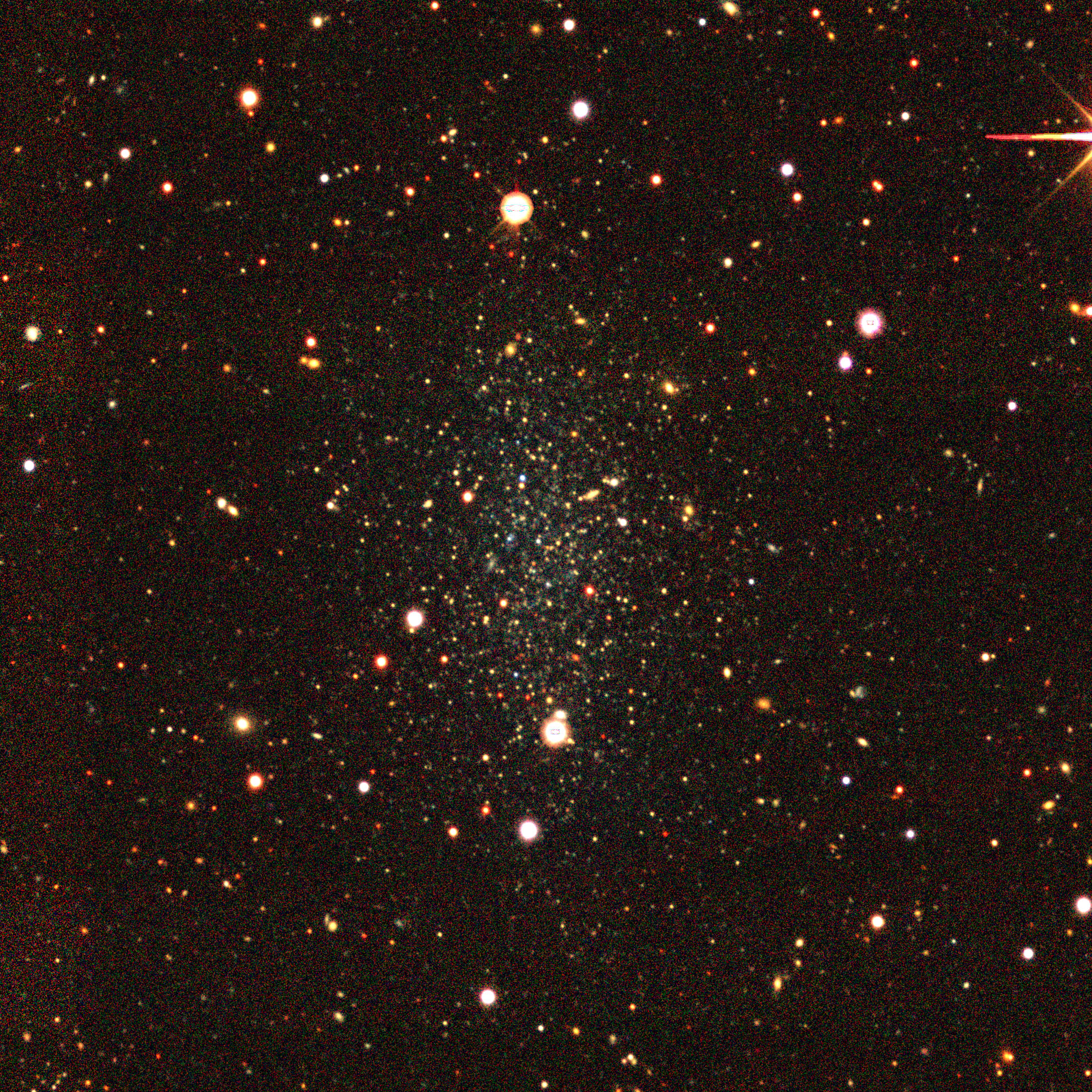
- Hubble Space Telescope image of the Pisces Dwarf

Observation data (J2000 epoch)
- Constellation: Pisces
- Right ascension: 01^{h} 03^{m} 55.0^{s}
- Declination: +21° 53′ 06″
- Redshift: -287 ± 0 km/s
- Distance: 2.51 ± 0.08 Mly (769 ± 25 kpc)
- Apparent magnitude (V): 14.2

Characteristics
- Type: dIrr/dSph
- Apparent size (V): 2′ × 2′

Other designations
- Pisces I, Psc I, LGS 3, PGC 3792, LEDA 3792

The Pisces Dwarf, also known as Pisces I (Psc I) or LGS3, is an irregular dwarf galaxy and suspected satellite galaxy of the Triangulum Galaxy (M33), located within the constellation Pisces. Discovered by astronomer Valentina Karachentseva in 1976, it is approaching the Milky Way at 287 km/s, evident by its blueshift, and may be a galaxy currently transitioning between a dwarf spheroidal and dwarf irregular galaxy; alternatively, it may be a rare unique version of one of the two types.

== Structure ==
The Pisces Dwarf has a very irregular shape, and is composed primarily of moderately aged and young stars, as given by its metallicity of [Fe/H]=−2.10 ± 0.22. Its star formation has declined, with its peak starburst period suspected to be an estimated 8 billion years ago, and a significant lack of new star formation within the past 100 million years. It is suspected to be a potential transition galaxy, currently transitioning from a dwarf irregular to a dwarf spheroidal galaxy.

== Gallery ==
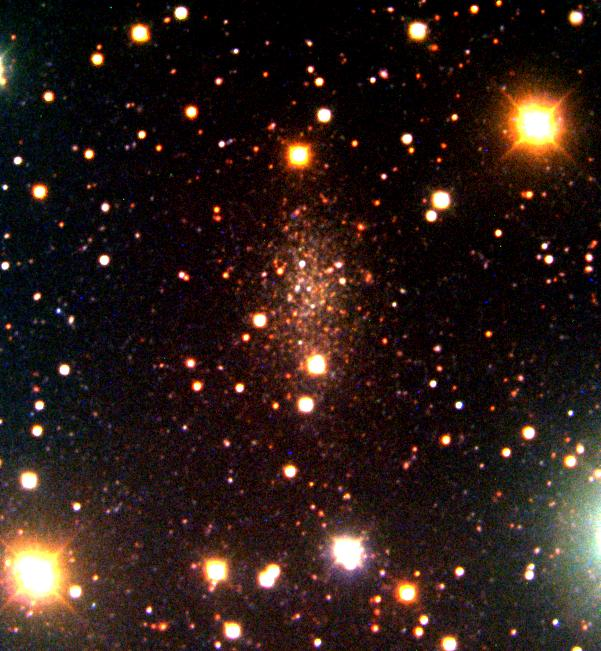
The Pisces Dwarf in combined UV and visible light

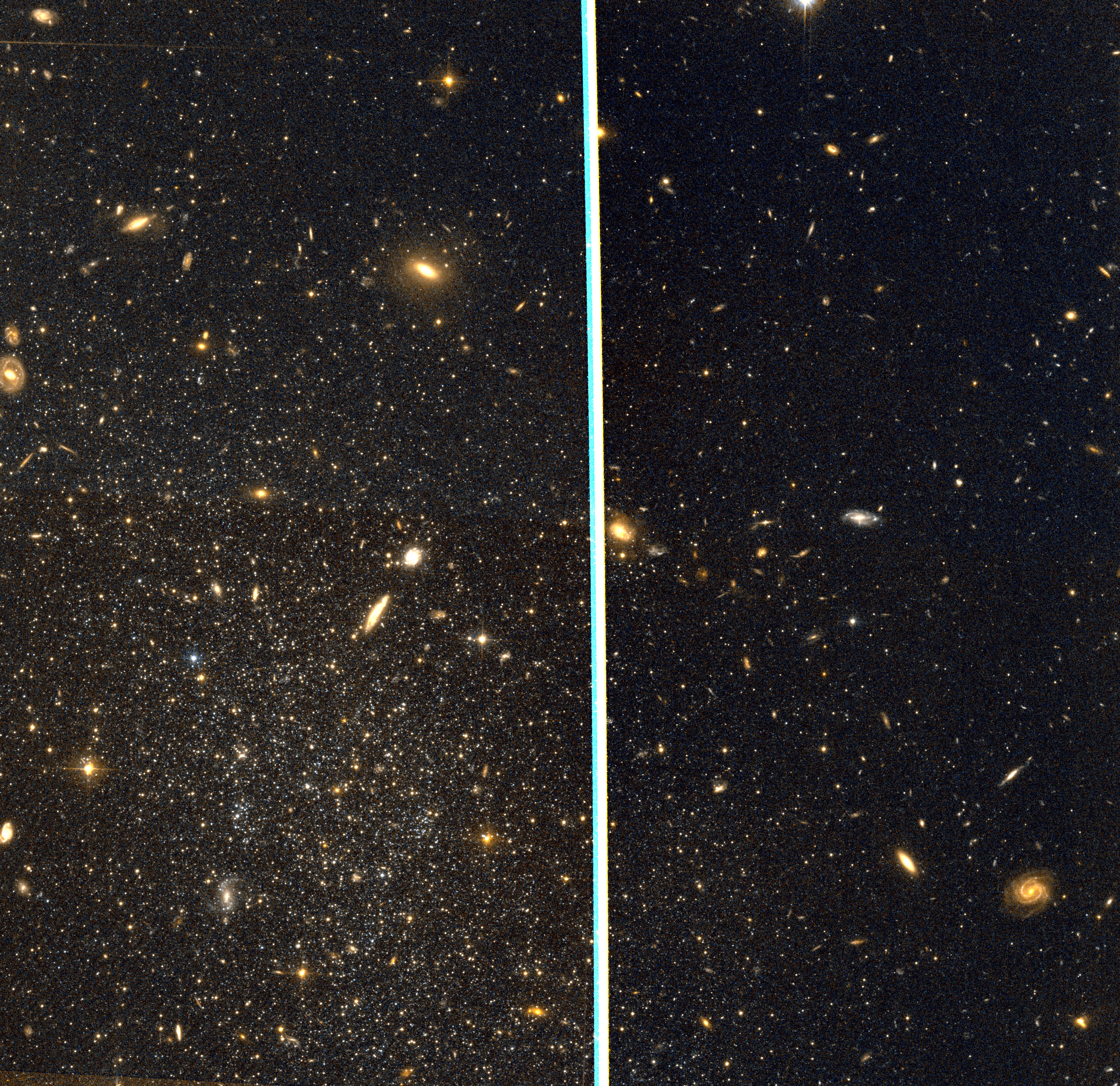
Cropped Hubble image of part of Pisces I
