= Pinwheel Galaxy (disambiguation) =

Pinwheel Galaxy may refer to:

- Messier 101, a galaxy referred to as the Pinwheel Galaxy
- Messier 83, a galaxy referred to as the Southern Pinwheel Galaxy
- Triangulum Galaxy (Messier 33), a galaxy sometimes referred to as the Pinwheel Galaxy
- Messier 99, a galaxy also referred to as the Coma Pinwheel Galaxy
- NGC 3184, a galaxy referred to as the Little Pinwheel Galaxy

== See also ==
- Pinwheel nebula
