= Triangulum Galaxy =

Spiral galaxy in the constellation Triangulum

- Galaxy Messier 33 in Triangulum (the Triangulum Galaxy)

Observation data (J2000 epoch)
- Pronunciation: /traɪˈæŋɡjʊləm/
- Constellation: Triangulum
- Right ascension: 01^{h} 33^{m} 50.02^{s}
- Declination: +30° 39′ 36.7″
- Redshift: -0.000607 ± 0.000010
- Heliocentric radial velocity: -179 ± 3 km/s
- Galactocentric velocity: -44 ± 6 km/s
- Distance: 883 kpc (2.88 Mly)
- Apparent magnitude (V): 5.72

Characteristics
- Type: SA(s)cd
- Mass: 5×10^{10} M_{☉}
- Number of stars: 30 to 40 billion ((3 to 4)×10^{10})
- Size: 61,120 ly (18.74 kpc) (diameter; 25.0 mag/arcsec^{2} B-band isophote)
- Apparent size (V): 70.8 × 41.7 arcminutes
- H I scale length (physical): 36.2 kpc (118,100 ly)

Other designations
- IRAS 01310+3024, NGC 598, UGC 1117, MCG +05-04-069, PGC 5818, CGCG 502-110

The Triangulum Galaxy is a spiral galaxy 2.878 million light-years (ly) from Earth in the constellation Triangulum. It is catalogued as Messier 33 or NGC 598. With the D_{25} isophotal diameter of 18.74 kiloparsecs (61,120 light-years), the Triangulum Galaxy is the third-largest member of the Local Group of galaxies, behind the Andromeda Galaxy and the Milky Way.

The galaxy is the second-smallest spiral galaxy in the Local Group after the Large Magellanic Cloud, which is a Magellanic-type spiral galaxy. It is believed to be a satellite of the Andromeda Galaxy or on its rebound into the latter due to their interactions, velocities, and proximity to one another in the night sky. It also has an H II nucleus.

== Etymology ==
The galaxy gets its name from the constellation Triangulum, where it can be spotted.

It is sometimes informally referred to as the "Pinwheel Galaxy" by some astronomy references, in some computerized telescope software, and in some public outreach websites. However, the SIMBAD Astronomical Database, a professional database, gathers formal designations for astronomical objects and indicates that Pinwheel Galaxy refers to Messier 101, which several amateur astronomy resources including public outreach websites identify by that name, and that is within the bounds of Ursa Major.

== Visibility ==
Under good viewing conditions with no light pollution, the Triangulum Galaxy can be seen by some people with the fully dark-adapted naked eye; to those viewers, it is the farthest permanent entity visible without magnification, being about 2.88 million lightyears from Earth. Second-farthest is the Andromeda Galaxy, at about 2.50 million lightyears. It is a diffuse, or extended, object rather than a starlike point, even without magnification, because of its physical extent.

Its observability without optical aid ranges from being relatively easily seen by people using direct vision in deep rural locations under a dark, clear, transparent sky, to requiring use of averted vision by observers in locations beyond the suburbs in shallow rural areas under good viewing conditions. It is one of the reference objects of the Bortle Dark-Sky Scale. M33 is one of the most difficult Messier objects to detect under light-polluted skies, though its visibility is relatively insensitive to sky brightness between Bortle 9 and 4.

Crumey has shown that although the total apparent V-magnitude of M33 is 5.72, it has an effective visual magnitude of approximately 6.6, meaning that a precondition for visibility is that the observer can see stars at least as faint as that latter figure. This is fainter than many people are able to see, even at a very dark site.

== Observation history ==
The Triangulum Galaxy was probably discovered by the Italian astronomer Giovanni Battista Hodierna before 1654. In his work De systemate orbis cometici; deque admirandis coeli caracteribus ("About the systematics of the cometary orbit, and about the admirable objects of the sky"), he listed it as a cloud-like nebulosity or obscuration and gave the cryptic description, "near the Triangle hinc inde". This is in reference to the constellation Triangulum as a pair of triangles. The magnitude of the object matches M33, so it is most likely a reference to the Triangulum Galaxy.

The galaxy was independently discovered by Charles Messier on the night of August 25–26, 1764. It was published in his Catalog of Nebulae and Star Clusters (1771) as object number 33; hence the name M33. When William Herschel compiled his extensive catalog of nebulae, he was careful not to include most of the objects identified by Messier. However, M33 was an exception, and he cataloged this object on September 11, 1784, as H V-17.

Herschel also cataloged the Triangulum Galaxy's brightest and largest H II region (diffuse emission nebula containing ionized hydrogen) as H III.150 separately from the galaxy itself; the nebula eventually obtained NGC number 604. As seen from Earth, NGC 604 is located northeast of the galaxy's central core. It is one of the largest H II regions known, with a diameter of nearly 1500 light-years and a spectrum similar to that of the Orion Nebula. Herschel also noted three other smaller H II regions (NGC 588, 592, and 595).

It was among the first "spiral nebulae" identified as such by Lord Rosse in 1850. In 1922–23, John Charles Duncan and Max Wolf discovered variable stars in the nebulae. Edwin Hubble showed in 1926 that 35 of these stars were classical Cepheids, thereby allowing him to estimate their distances. The results were consistent with the concept of spiral nebulae being independent galactic systems of gas and dust, rather than just nebulae in the Milky Way.

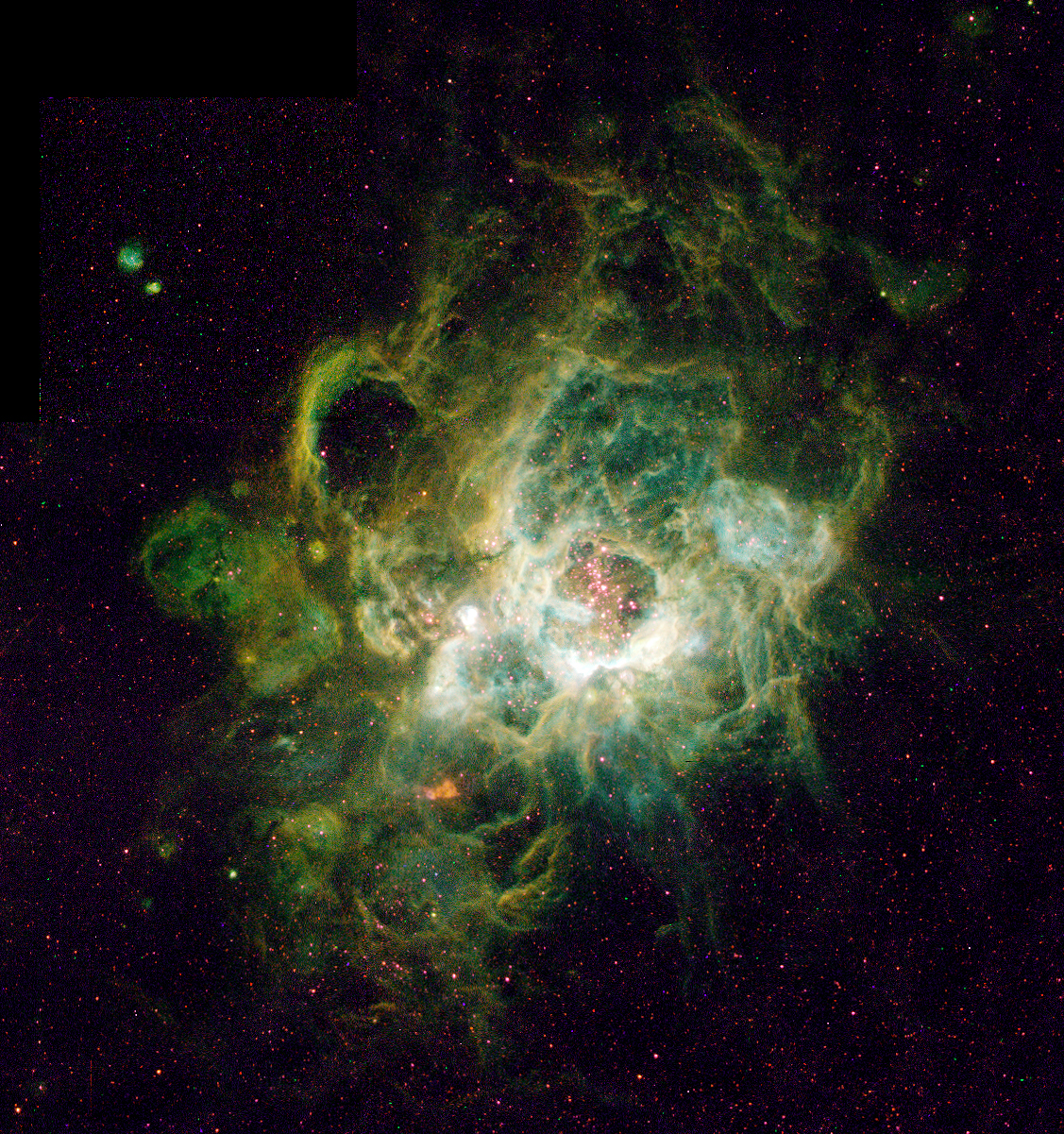
NGC 604 in the Triangulum Galaxy

Composite of about 54 different pointings with Hubble's Advanced Camera for Surveys

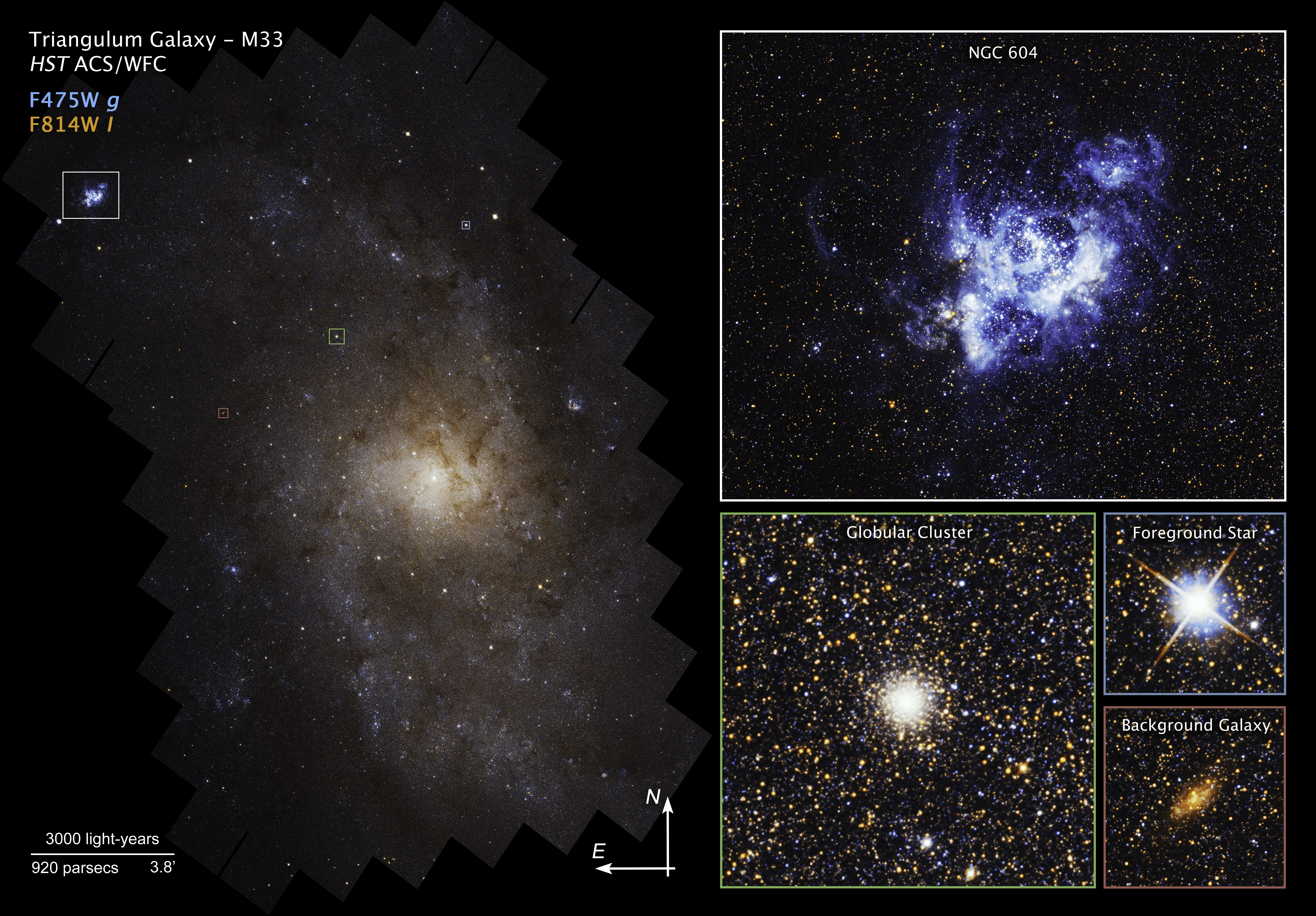
Close-up images of the Triangulum Galaxy

== Properties ==
The Triangulum Galaxy is the third largest member of the Local Group of galaxies. It has a diameter measured through the D_{25} standard - the isophote where the surface brightness of the galaxy reaches 25 mag/arcsec^{2}, to be about 18.74 kiloparsecs (61,100 light-years), making it roughly 70% the size of the Milky Way. It may be a gravitationally bound companion of the Andromeda Galaxy. Triangulum may be home to 30 to 40 billion stars, compared to 400 billion for the Milky Way and 1 trillion for Andromeda.

The disk of Triangulum has an estimated mass of (3–6) billion solar masses, while the gas component is about 3.2 billion solar masses. Thus, the combined mass of all baryonic matter in the galaxy may be 10 billion solar masses. The contribution of the dark matter component out to a radius of 55×10^{3} ly (17 kpc) is equivalent to about 50 billion solar masses.

=== Location – distance – motion ===
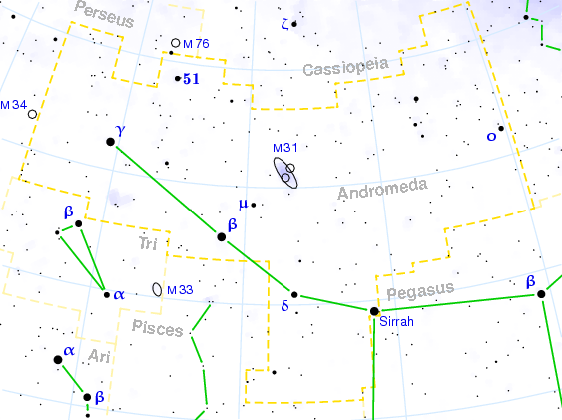
Triangulum (M33; lower left of center) and Andromeda Galaxy (M31; above center)

Estimates of the distance from the Milky Way to the Triangulum Galaxy vary depending on the measurement technique. The average of 102 distance estimates published since 1987 gives a distance modulus of 24.69, or 0.883 Mpc (2.878 Mly). In general, measurements range from 2.380×10^{6} to 3.070×10^{6} ly (730 to 941 kpc) (or 2.38 to 3.07 Mly), with most estimates since the year 2000 lying in the middle portion of this range. This makes the Triangulum Galaxy slightly more distant than the Andromeda Galaxy (at 2.54 Mly). The Triangulum Galaxy is around 0.75 Mly from the Andromeda Galaxy.

Using the Cepheid variable method, an estimate of 2.770×10^{6} ± 0.130×10^{6} ly (849 ± 40 kpc) was achieved in 2004. In the same year, the tip of the red-giant branch (TRGB) method was used to derive a distance estimate of 2.590×10^{6} ± 0.080×10^{6} ly (794 ± 25 kpc). In 2006, a group of astronomers announced the discovery of an eclipsing binary star in the Triangulum Galaxy. By studying the eclipses of the stars, astronomers were able to measure their sizes. Knowing the sizes and temperatures of the stars, they were able to measure the absolute magnitude of the stars. When the visual and absolute magnitudes are known, the distance to the star can be measured. The stars lie at the distance of 3.070×10^{6} ± 0.240×10^{6} ly (941 ± 74 kpc). Measurements of blue supergiants in 2009 indicated a distance of 940 kpc (3.2 Mly) In 2023, the distance to M33 was measured to be 840 ± 11 kpc using Cepheid photometry.

The Triangulum Galaxy is a source of H_{2}O maser emission. In 2005, using observations of two water masers on opposite sides of Triangulum via the VLBA, researchers were for the first time able to estimate the angular rotation and proper motion of Triangulum. A velocity of 190 ± 60 km/s relative to the Milky Way was computed, which means the Triangulum Galaxy is moving toward the Andromeda Galaxy and suggesting it may be a satellite of the larger galaxy (depending on their relative distances and margins of error).

In 2004, evidence was announced of a clumpy stream of hydrogen gas linking the Andromeda Galaxy with Triangulum, suggesting that the two may have tidally interacted in the past. This discovery was confirmed in 2011. A distance of less than 300 kiloparsecs between the two supports this hypothesis.

The Pisces Dwarf (LGS 3), one of the small Local Group member galaxies, is located 2,022×10^{3} ly (620 kpc) from the Sun. It is 20° from the Andromeda Galaxy and 11° from Triangulum. As LGS 3 lies at a distance of 913×10^{3} ly (280 kpc) from both galaxies, it could be a satellite galaxy of either Andromeda or Triangulum. LGS 3 has a core radius of 483 ly (148 pc) and 26 million solar masses.

Pisces VII/Triangulum (Tri) III may be another satellite of Triangulum.

=== Structure ===
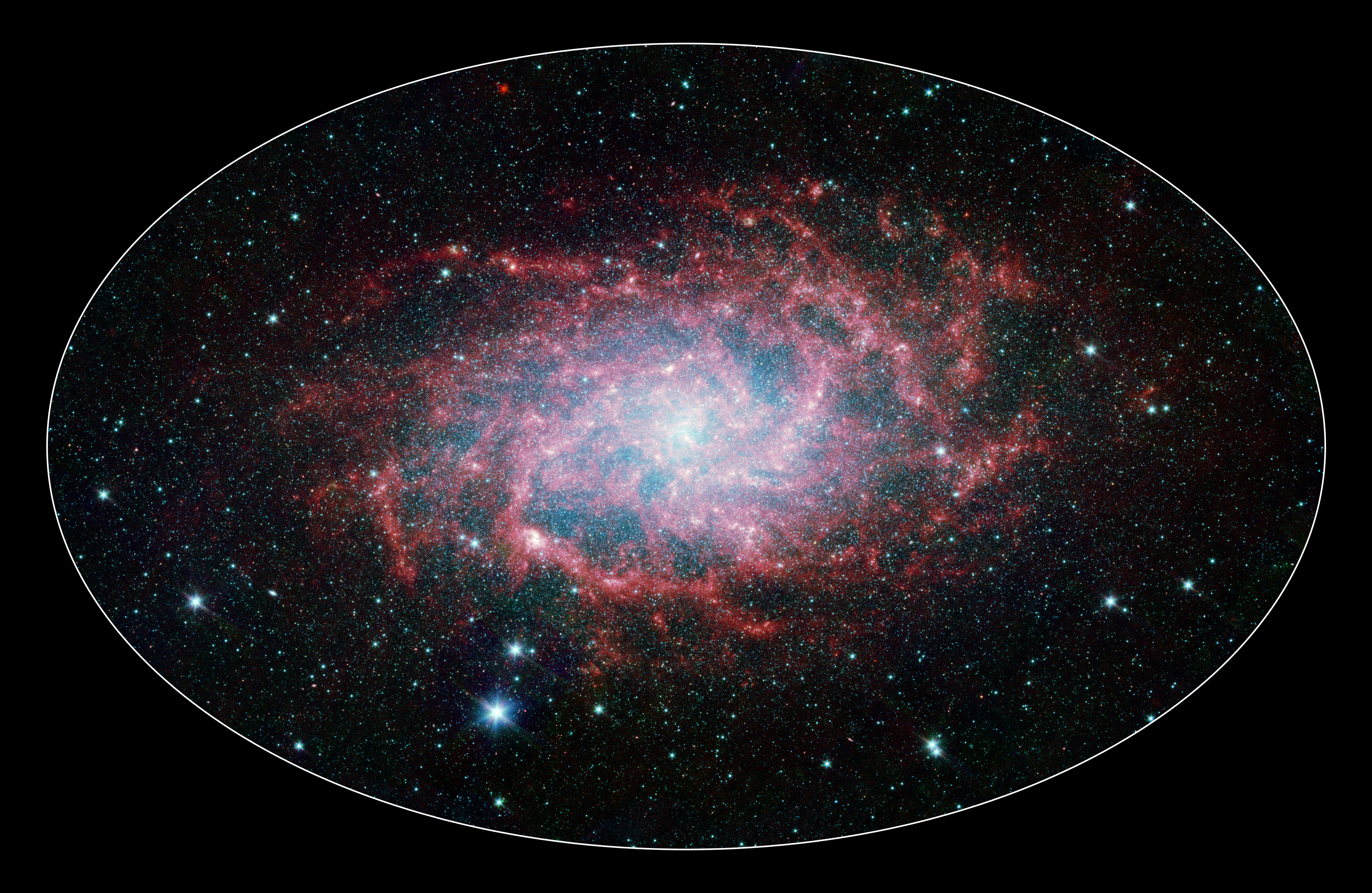
Infrared image of M33 taken with the Spitzer Space Telescope

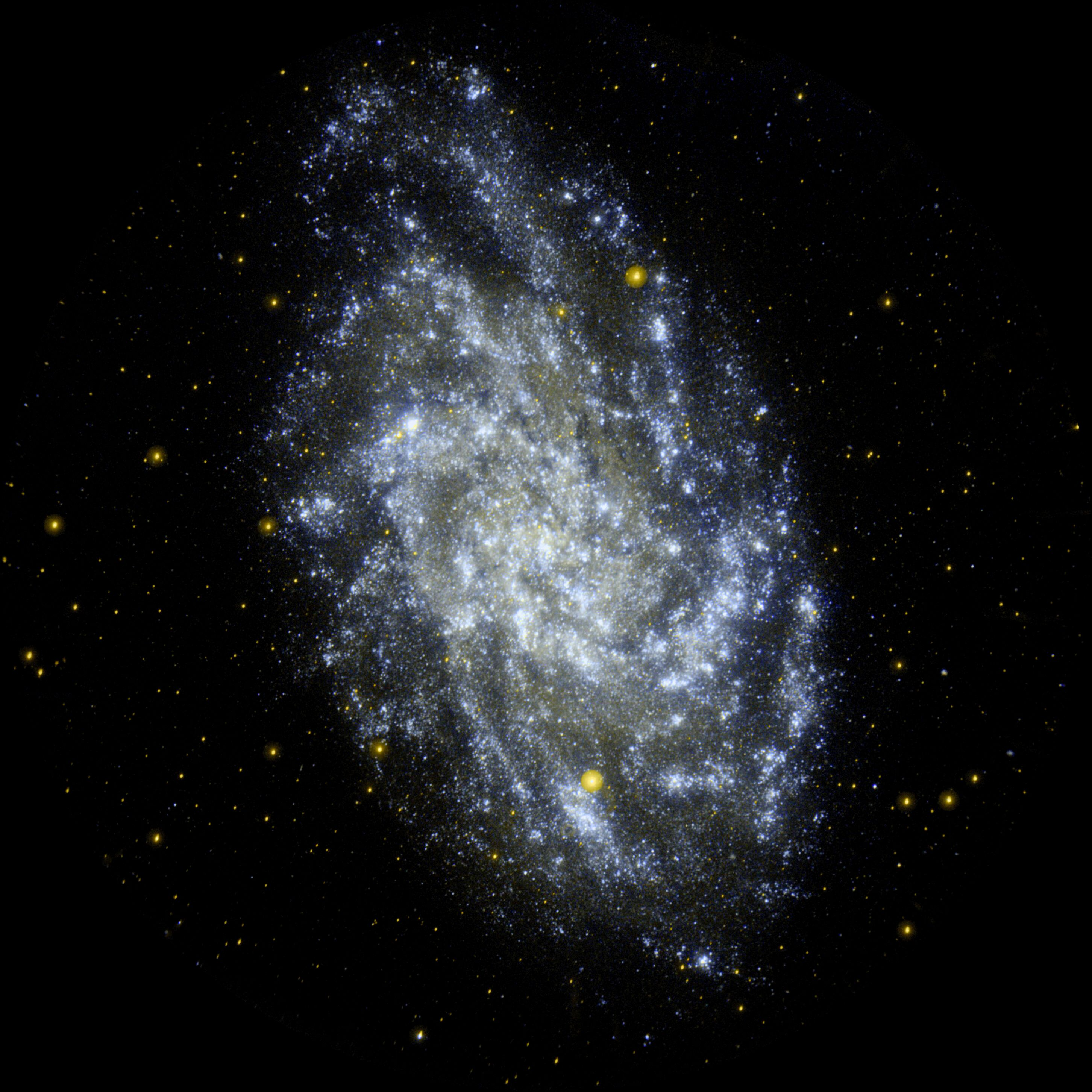
Ultraviolet image of M33 by GALEX observatory

In the French astronomer Gérard de Vaucouleurs' revised Hubble Sandage (VRHS) system of galaxy morphological classification, the Triangulum Galaxy is classified as type SA(s)cd. The S prefix indicates that it is a disk-shaped galaxy with prominent arms of gas and dust that spiral out from the nucleus—what is commonly known as a spiral galaxy. The A is assigned when the galactic nucleus lacks a bar-shaped structure, in contrast to SB class barred spiral galaxies. American astronomer Allan Sandage's "(s)" notation is used when the spiral arms emerge directly from the nucleus or central bar, rather than from an inner ring as with an (r)-type galaxy. Finally, the cd suffix represents a stage along the spiral sequence that describes the openness of the arms. A rating of cd indicates relatively loosely wound arms.

This galaxy has an inclination of 54° to the line of sight from Earth, allowing the structure to be examined without significant obstruction by gas and dust. The disk of the Triangulum Galaxy appears warped out to a radius of about 8 kpc. There may be a halo surrounding the galaxy, but there is no bulge at the nucleus. This is an isolated galaxy and there are no indications of recent mergers or interactions with other galaxies, and it lacks the dwarf spheroidals or tidal tails associated with the Milky Way.

Triangulum is classified as unbarred, but an analysis of the galaxy's shape shows what may be a weak bar-like structure about the galactic nucleus. The radial extent of this structure is about 0.8 kpc.

The nucleus of this galaxy is an H II region, and it contains an ultraluminous X-ray source with an emission of 1.2 × 10^{39} erg s^{−1}, which is the most luminous source of X-rays in the Local Group of galaxies. This source is modulated by 20% over a 106-day cycle. However, the nucleus does not appear to contain a supermassive black hole, as a best-fit value of zero mass and an upper limit of 1,500 M_{☉} is placed on the mass of a central black hole based on models and the Hubble Space Telescope (HST) data. This is significantly lower than the mass expected from the velocity dispersion of the nucleus and far below any mass predicted from the disk kinematics. This may suggest that supermassive black holes are associated only with galaxy bulges instead of with their disks. Assuming that the upper limit of the central black hole is correct, it would be rather an intermediate-mass black hole.

The inner part of the galaxy has two luminous spiral arms, along with multiple spurs that connect the inner to the outer spiral features. The main arms are designated IN (north) and IS (south).

=== Star formation ===
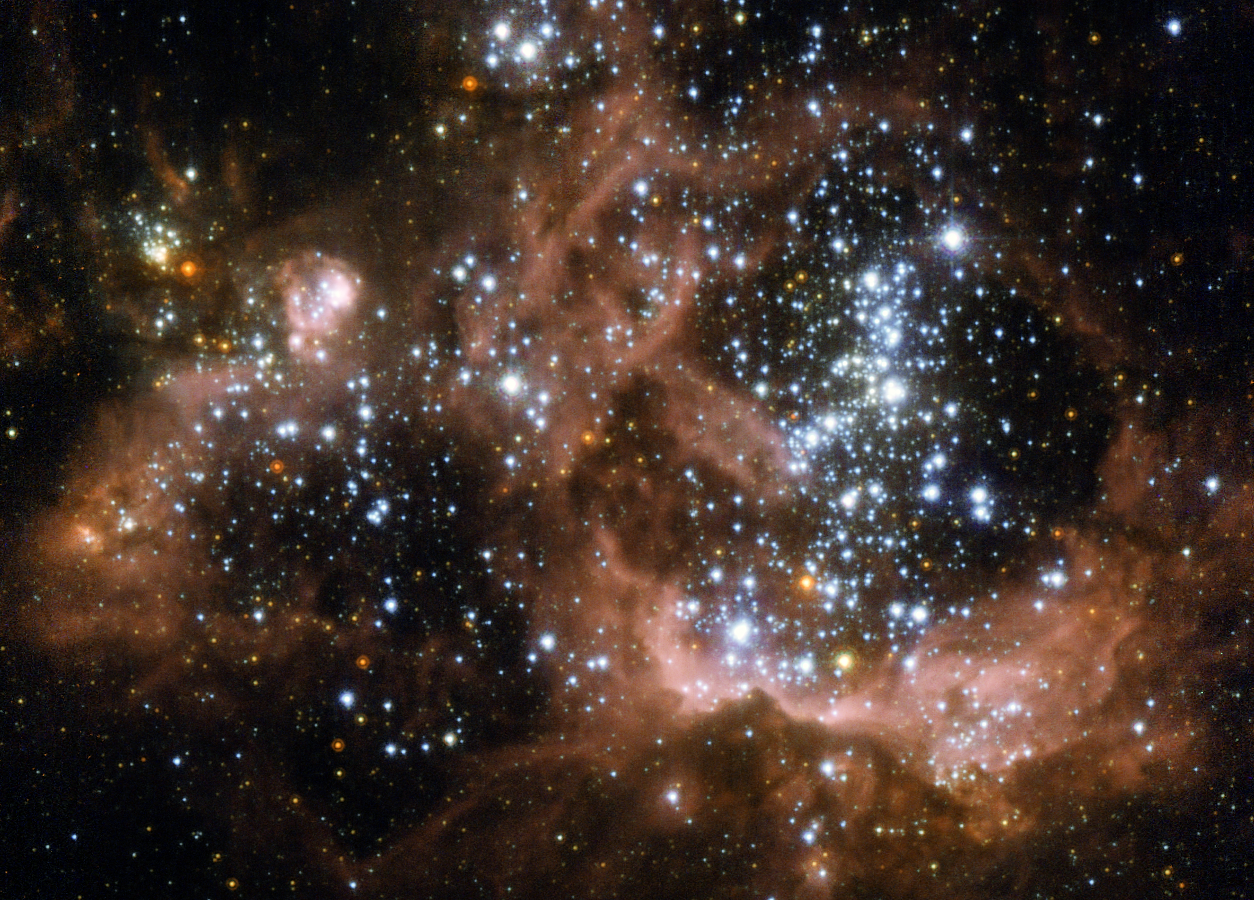
NGC 604, a star-forming region in the Triangulum Galaxy, as imaged by the Hubble Space Telescope

In the central 4′ region of this galaxy, atomic gas is being efficiently converted to molecular gas, resulting in a strong spectral emission of CO. This effect occurs as giant molecular clouds condense out of the surrounding interstellar medium. A similar process is taking place outside the central 4′, but at a less efficient pace. About 10% of the gas content in this galaxy is in the molecular form.

Star formation is taking place at a rate that is strongly correlated with local gas density, and the rate per unit area is higher than in the neighboring Andromeda Galaxy. (The rate of star formation is about 3.4 solar masses Gyr^{−1} pc^{−2} in the Triangulum Galaxy, compared to 0.74 in Andromeda.) The total integrated rate of star formation in the Triangulum Galaxy is about 0.45 ± 0.1 solar masses per year. It is uncertain whether this net rate is currently decreasing or remaining constant.

Based on analysis of the chemical composition of this galaxy, it appears to be divided into two distinct components with differing histories. The inner disk within a radius of 30×10^{3} ly (9 kpc) has a typical composition gradient that decreases linearly from the core. Beyond this radius, out to about 82×10^{3} ly (25 kpc), the gradient is much flatter. This suggests a different star formation history between the inner disk and the outer disk and halo, and may be explained by a scenario of "inside-out" galaxy formation. This occurs when gas is accumulated at large radii later in a galaxy's life space, while the gas at the core becomes exhausted. The result is a decrease in the average age of stars with increasing radius from the galaxy core.

=== Discrete features ===
Using infrared observations from the Spitzer Space Telescope, a total of 515 discrete candidate sources of 24 μm emission within the Triangulum Galaxy have been catalogued as of 2007. The brightest sources lie within the central region of the galaxy and along the spiral arms.

Many of the emission sources are associated with H II regions of star formation. The four brightest HII regions are designated NGC 588, NGC 592, NGC 595, and NGC 604. These regions are associated with molecular clouds containing 120,000 to 400,000 solar masses. The brightest of these regions, NGC 604, may have undergone a discrete outburst of star formation about three million years ago. This nebula is the second most luminous HII region within the Local Group of galaxies, at 45 ± 15 million times the luminosity of the Sun. Other prominent HII regions in Triangulum include IC 132, IC 133, and IK 53.

The northern main spiral arm contains four large HII regions, while the southern arm has greater concentrations of young, hot stars. The estimated rate of supernova explosions in the Triangulum Galaxy is 0.06 Type Ia and 0.62 Type Ib/Type II per century. This is equivalent to a supernova explosion every 147 years, on average. As of 2008, a total of 100 supernova remnants have been identified in the Triangulum Galaxy, the majority of which lie in the southern half of the spiral galaxy. Similar asymmetries exist for H I and H II regions, plus highly luminous concentrations of massive, O type stars. The center of the distribution of these features is offset about two arc minutes to the southwest. M33 being a local galaxy, the Central Bureau for Astronomical Telegrams (CBAT) tracks novae in it along with M31 and M81.

About 54 globular clusters have been identified in this galaxy, but the actual number may be 122 or more. The confirmed clusters may be several billion years younger than globular clusters in the Milky Way, and cluster formation appears to have increased during the past 100 million years. This increase is correlated with an inflow of gas into the center of the galaxy. The ultraviolet emission of massive stars in this galaxy matches the level of similar stars in the Large Magellanic Cloud.

In 2007, a black hole about 15.7 times the mass of the Sun was detected in this galaxy using data from the Chandra X-ray Observatory. The black hole, named M33 X-7, orbits a companion star which it eclipses every 3.5 days. It is the largest stellar mass black hole known.

Unlike the Milky Way and Andromeda galaxies, the Triangulum Galaxy does not appear to have a supermassive black hole at its center. This may be because the mass of a galaxy's central supermassive black hole correlates with the size of the galaxy's central bulge, and unlike the Milky Way and Andromeda, the Triangulum Galaxy is a pure disk galaxy with no bulge.

=== Relationship with the Andromeda Galaxy ===
As mentioned above, M33 is linked to M31 by several streams of neutral hydrogen and stars, which suggests that a past interaction between these two galaxies took place from 2 to 8 billion years ago, and a more violent encounter will occur 2.5 billion years in the future.

The fate of M33 was uncertain in 2009 beyond seeming to be linked to its larger neighbor M31. Suggested scenarios include being torn apart and absorbed by the greater companion, fueling the latter with hydrogen to form new stars; eventually exhausting all of its gas, and thus the ability to form new stars; or participating in the collision between the Milky Way and M31, likely ending up orbiting the merger product and fusing with it much later. Two other possibilities are a collision with the Milky Way before the Andromeda Galaxy arrives or an ejection out of the Local Group. In 2019, astrometric data from Gaia appears to rule out the possibility that M33 and M31 are in orbit. If correct, M33 is on its first infall proper into the Andromeda Galaxy (M31).

== See also ==
- List of galaxies
- Messier object
- List of Messier objects
- New General Catalogue
- NGC 55
- Pisces Dwarf
- Andromeda–Milky Way collision
