= NGC 588 =

Diffuse nebula in the constellation Triangulum

Diffuse nebula
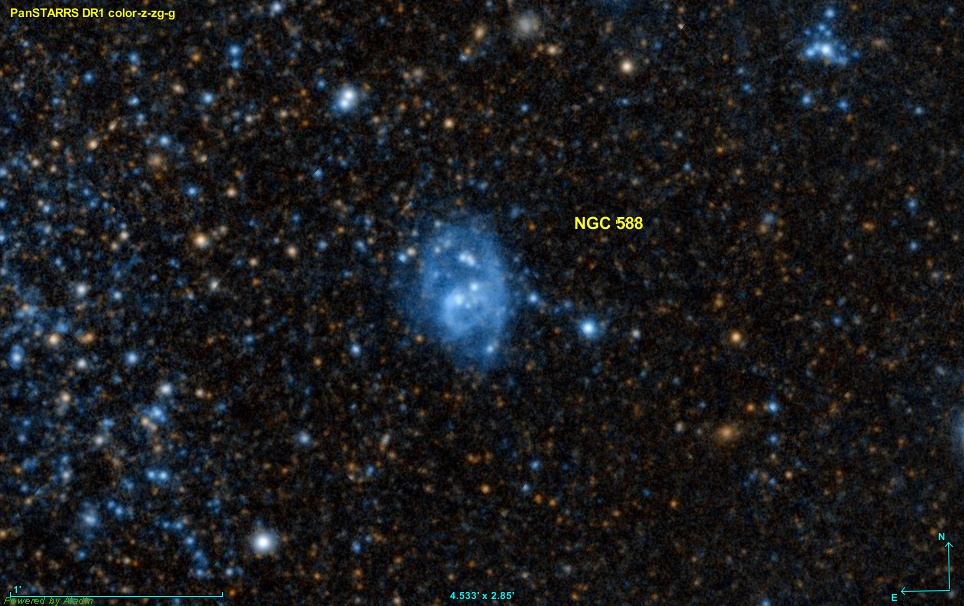
- NGC 588 imaged by Pan-STARRS

Observation data: epoch
- Subtype: H II
- Right ascension: 1^{h} 32.7^{m} 00^{s}
- Declination: +30° 40′ 00″
- Distance: z=−0.000580
- Apparent dimensions (V): 0.65 arc minutes?
- Constellation: Triangulum
- Designations: IRAS 01299+3023

NGC 588 is a prominent, giant H II ionized diffuse nebula located in the outskirts of the galaxy Messier 33's spiral arms, within the constellation Triangulum. It was discovered October 2, 1861, by the German–Danish astronomer Heinrich d'Arrest.

The nebula has two Wolf-Rayet stars, NGC 588-UIT 008 and NGC 588-MC3 and a fairly large population of main sequence stars of 2 to 20 solar masses. The more massive stars in the nebula have a mass of around 40 solar masses. NGC 588 is 4.2 million years old and has a mass of 2300 solar masses.

NGC 588 and NGC 592 (another nebula in the Triangulum galaxy) are both very prominent stellar nurseries in their regions.
