= 205th Division (1st Formation) (People's Republic of China) =

205th Division (1949-50)
- Active: 1949.1 - 1950.9
- Country: People's Republic of China
- Branch: People's Liberation Army
- Type: Division
- Role: Infantry
- Part of: 69th Corps
- Engagements: Chinese Civil War

The 205th Division (Chinese: 第205师) was created in January 1949 under the Regulation of the Redesignations of All Organizations and Units of the Army, issued by Central Military Commission on November 1, 1948, basing on the 19th Brigade, 7th Column of Huabei Military Region. Its origin could be traced to 9th Independent Brigade of Jizhong Military District formed in July 1947.

The division was a part of 69th Corps. Under the flag of 205th it took part in battles during the Chinese Civil War.

The division was then composed of:

- 613th Infantry Regiment;
- 614th Infantry Regiment;
- 615th Infantry Regiment.

In March 1949, along with the disbandment of 69th Corps, the division exchanged all its personnel with 206th Division, and absorbed personnel from the disbanding 207th Division. Since then the division was put under direct control of Huabei Military Region.

In September 1950, the division was inactivated and re-organized as Air Defense Command of Huabei Military Region.
