= 206th Division (1st Formation) (People's Republic of China) =

206th Division (1949-50)
- Active: 1949.1 - 1950.12
- Country: People's Republic of China
- Branch: People's Liberation Army
- Type: Division
- Role: Infantry
- Part of: 69th Corps
- Engagements: Chinese Civil War

The 206th Division (Chinese: 第206师) was created in January 1949 under the Regulation of the Redesignations of All Organizations and Units of the Army, issued by Central Military Commission on November 1, 1948, basing on the 20th Brigade, 7th Column of Huabei Military Region, formed in November 1947.

The division was a part of 69th Corps. Under the flag of 206th it took part in battles during the Chinese Civil War.

The division was then composed of:

- 616th Infantry Regiment;
- 617th Infantry Regiment;
- 618th Infantry Regiment.

In March 1949, along with the disbandment of 69th Corps, the division exchanged all its personnel with 205th Division, and absorbed personnel from the disbanding 207th Division. Since then the division was put under direct control of Huabei Military Region.

In December 1950 the division was inactivated. Its divisional HQ was converted to HQ, 6th Aviation Division of the PLAAF, and its personnel were absorbed by 66th, 67th and 68th Corps as replacements.
