= NGC 206 =

OB association in the Andromeda Galaxy

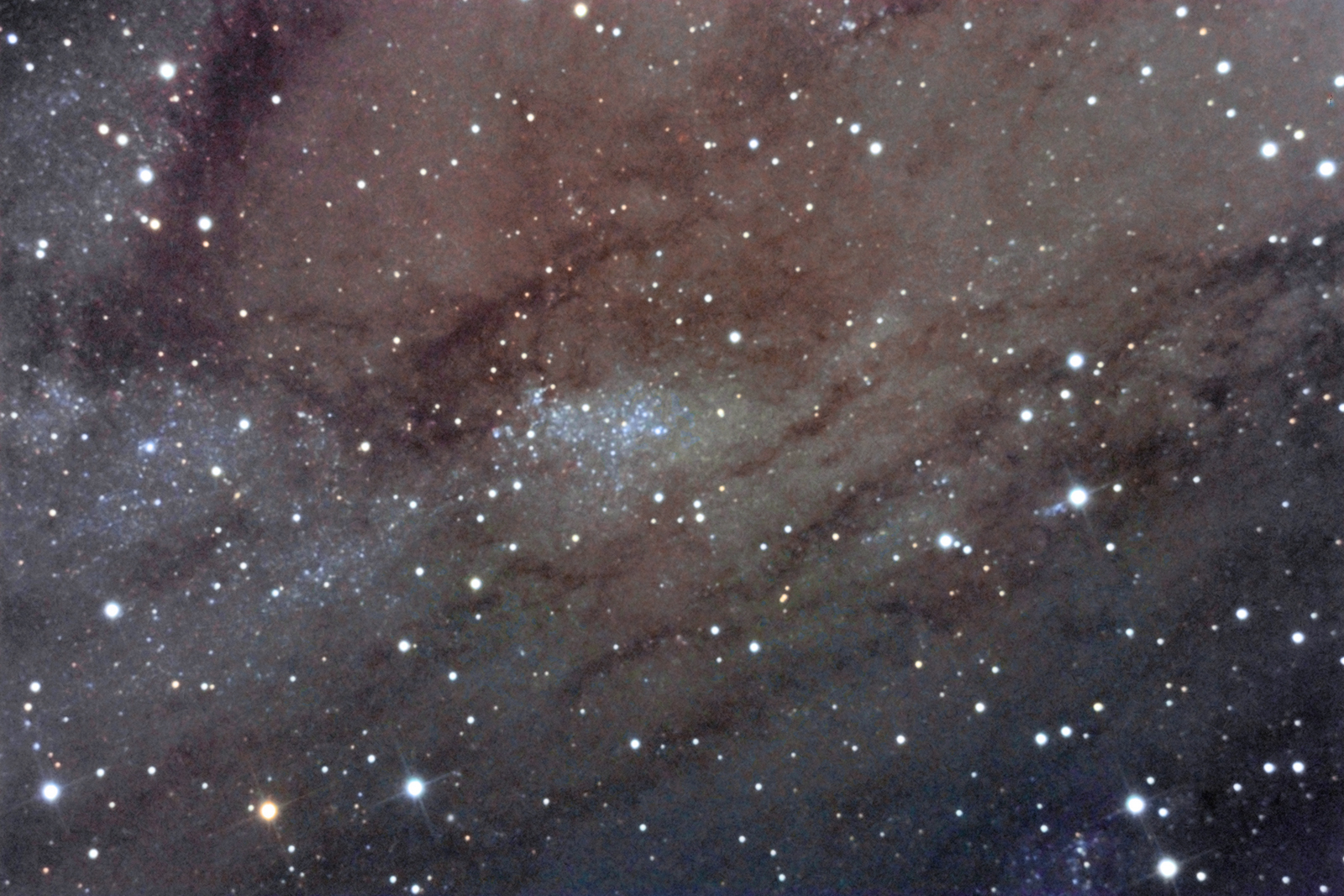
- NGC 206

Observation data (J2000 epoch)
- Right ascension: 00^{h} 40^{m} 31.3^{s}
- Declination: +40° 44′ 21″
- Absolute magnitude (V): Unknown
- Apparent dimensions (V): 4.2′ (arcmin)

Physical characteristics
- Radius: Ca. 400 ly

Associations
- Constellation: Andromeda

NGC 206 is a bright star cloud in the Andromeda Galaxy, and the brightest star cloud in Andromeda when viewed from Earth. It was discovered by German-born English astronomer William Herschel in 1786 and possibly even two years earlier when he observed "a streak of milky nebulosity, horizontal, or part of the 31st Nebula."

== Features ==
NGC 206 is the richest and most conspicuous star cloud in the Andromeda Galaxy, and is one of the largest and brightest star-forming regions in the Local Group. It contains more than 300 stars brighter than M_{b}=−3.6. It was originally identified by Edwin Hubble as a star cluster but today, due to its size, it is classified as an OB association.

NGC 206 is located in a spiral arm of the Andromeda Galaxy, in a zone free of neutral hydrogen. It contains hundreds of stars of spectral types O and B. The star cloud has a double structure: one region has an age of around 10 million years and includes several H II regions in its border; the other region has an age of 40 to 50 million years and includes a number of cepheids. The two regions are separated by a band of interstellar dust.

== See also ==
- List of Andromeda's satellite galaxies
