= 206th Division (2nd Formation) (People's Republic of China) =

206th Army Division (1969–85)
- Active: 1969.12 - 1985.9
- Country: People's Republic of China
- Branch: People's Liberation Army
- Type: Division
- Role: Infantry
- Part of: 69th Army Corps

206th Army Division (Chinese: 陆军第206师) was formed in December 1969 from 6th Engineer District of Beijing Military Region.

The division was a part of 69th Army Corps. From 1969 to 1985 the division was composed of:

- 616th Infantry Regiment;
- 617th Infantry Regiment;
- 618th Infantry Regiment;
- Artillery Regiment.

The division was disbanded in September 1985.
