= NGC 604 =

H II region inside the Triangulum Galaxy

Emission nebula
- H II region
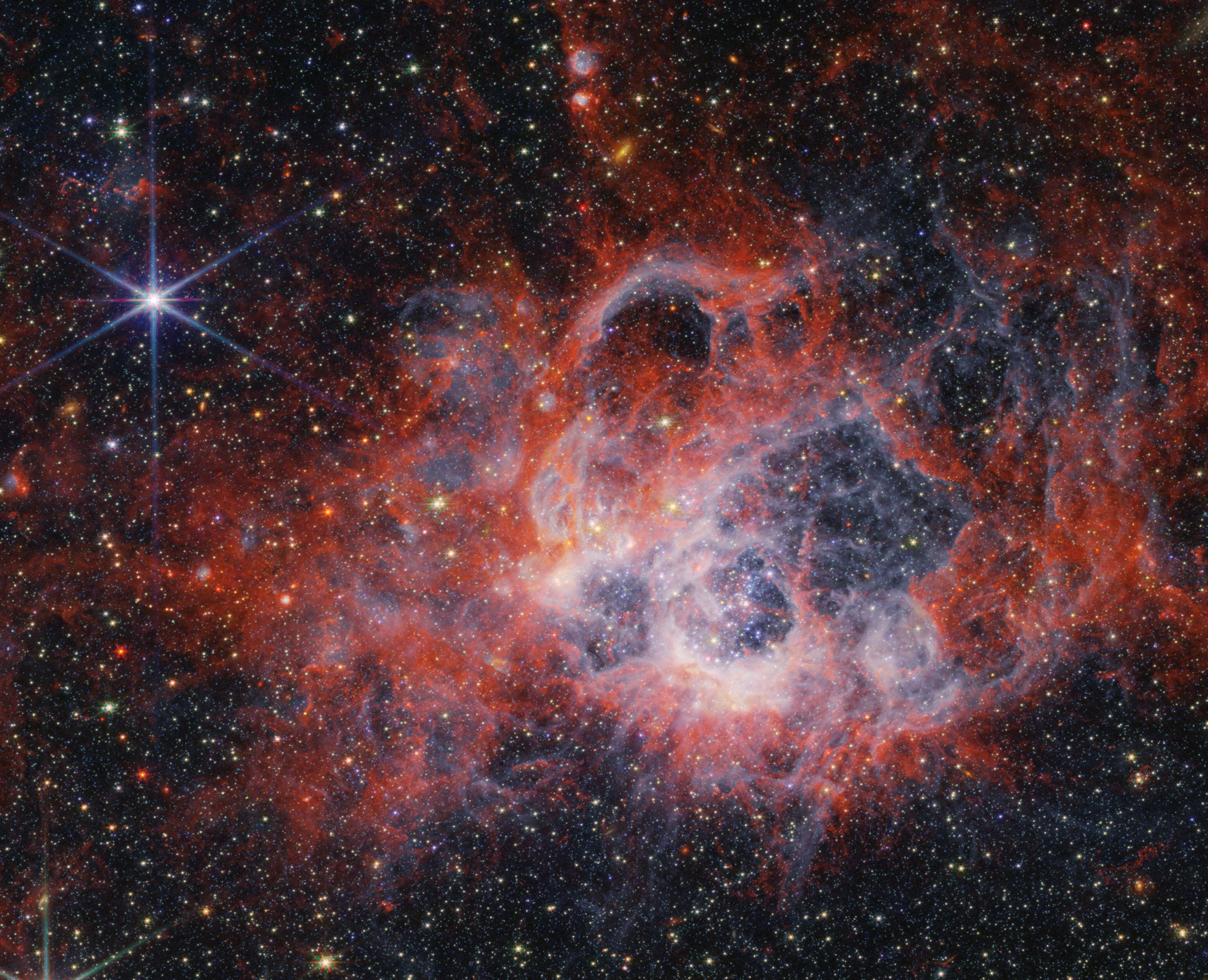
- NGC 604 inside the Triangulum Galaxy (viewed by the James Webb Space Telescope)

Observation data: J2000 epoch
- Right ascension: 01^{h} 34^{m} 33.2^{s}
- Declination: +30° 47′ 06″
- Distance: 2,700,000 ly (840,000 pc)
- Apparent magnitude (V): +14.0
- Apparent dimensions (V): 1.93′ x 1.2′ arcmins
- Constellation: Triangulum

Physical characteristics
- Radius: 760 ly
- Absolute magnitude (V): -13.8
- Notable features: massive supergiant H II region 3.5 million years old

NGC 604 is a supergiant H II region inside the Triangulum Galaxy. It was discovered by William Herschel on September 11, 1784. It is among the largest H II regions in the Local Group of galaxies; at the galaxy's estimated distance of 2.7 million light-years, its longest diameter is roughly 1,520 light years (~460 parsecs), over 40 times the size of the visible portion of the Orion Nebula. It is over 6,300 times more luminous than the Orion Nebula, and if it were at the same distance it would outshine Venus. Its gas is ionized by a cluster of massive stars at its center with 200 stars of spectral type O and WR, a mass of 10^{5} solar masses, and an age of 3.5 million years; however, unlike the Large Magellanic Cloud's Tarantula Nebula central cluster (R136), NGC 604's one is much less compact and more similar to a large stellar association.

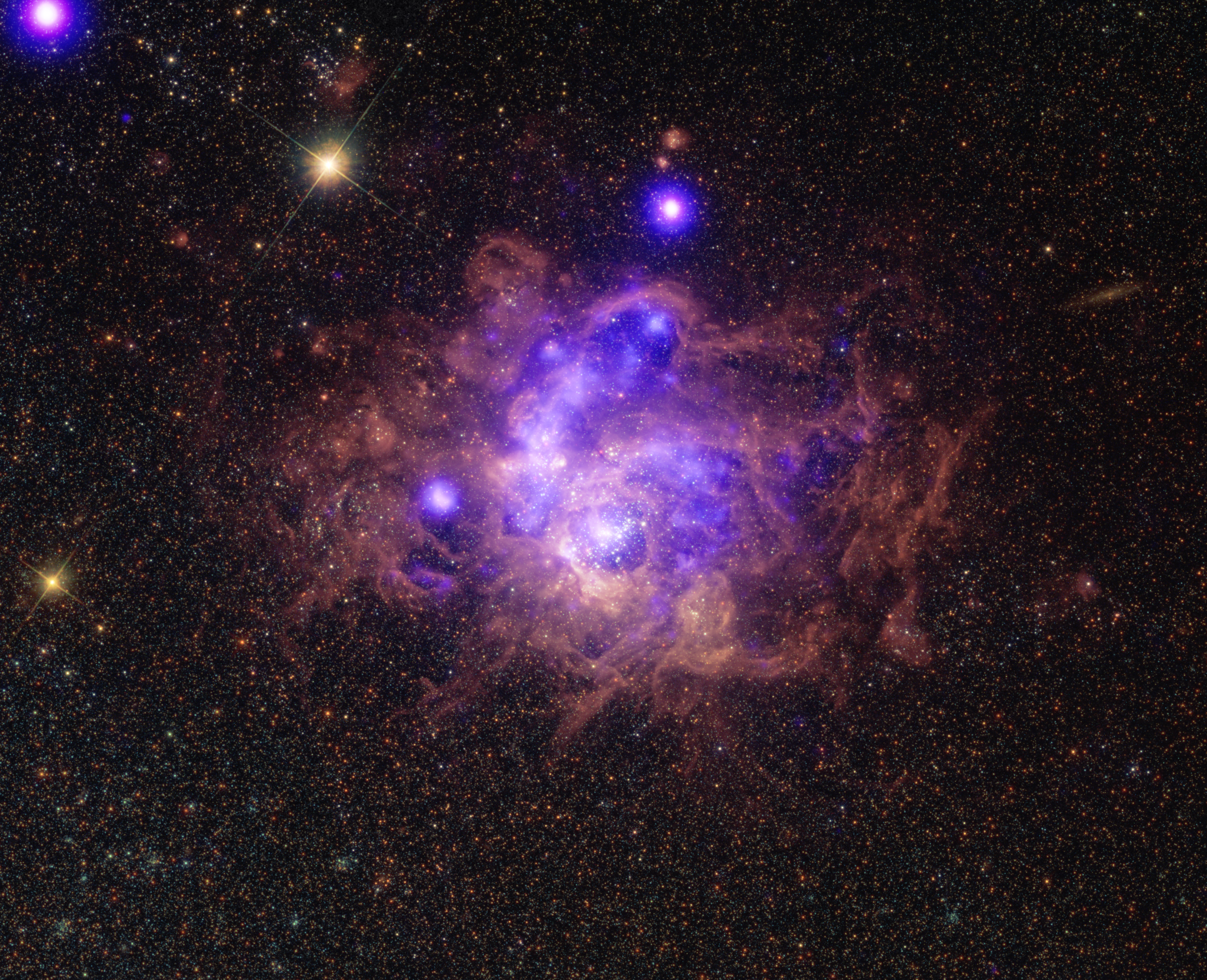
NGC 604, shown using the Hubble Space Telescope and Chandra, shows the nebula in the visible light and X-Rays

== Notes ==
- Some data in the table was updated from Sue French's column "Deep-sky Wonders", in the January 2006 issue of Sky & Telescope, p. 83.
