= 206th =

206th may refer to:

- 206th (Canadien-Français) Battalion, CEF, a unit in the Canadian Expeditionary Force during the First World War
- 206th Combat Communications Squadron (206 CBCS), an Air National Guard combat communications unit located at Elmendorf AFB, Alaska
- 206th Field Artillery Regiment, a United States artillery regiment Headquartered at Russellville, Arkansas. T
- 206th Infantry Division (Wehrmacht), a German military unit that served during World War II
- 206th (2nd Essex) Brigade, a formation of the British Army during World War I

== See also ==
- 206 (number)
- 206, the year 206 (CCVI) of the Julian calendar
