= 206 =

206 in various calendars
- Gregorian calendar: 206; CCVI
- Ab urbe condita: 959
- Assyrian calendar: 4956
- Balinese saka calendar: 127–128
- Bengali calendar: −388 – −387
- Berber calendar: 1156
- Buddhist calendar: 750
- Burmese calendar: −432
- Byzantine calendar: 5714–5715
- Chinese calendar: 乙酉年 (Wood Rooster); 2903 or 2696 — to — 丙戌年 (Fire Dog); 2904 or 2697
- Coptic calendar: −78 – −77
- Discordian calendar: 1372
- Ethiopian calendar: 198–199
- Hebrew calendar: 3966–3967
- Hindu calendars
- Vikram Samvat: 262–263
- Shaka Samvat: 127–128
- Kali Yuga: 3306–3307
- Holocene calendar: 10206
- Iranian calendar: 416 BP – 415 BP
- Islamic calendar: 429 BH – 428 BH
- Javanese calendar: 83–84
- Julian calendar: 206; CCVI
- Korean calendar: 2539
- Minguo calendar: 1706 before ROC 民前1706年
- Nanakshahi calendar: −1262
- Seleucid era: 517/518 AG
- Thai solar calendar: 748–749
- Tibetan calendar: ཤིང་མོ་བྱ་ལོ་ (female Wood-Bird); 332 or −49 or −821 — to — མེ་ཕོ་ཁྱི་ལོ་ (male Fire-Dog); 333 or −48 or −820

Year 216 (CCVI) was a common year starting on Wednesday of the Julian calendar. At the time, it was known as the Year of the Consulship of Umbrius and Gavius (or, less frequently, year 959 Ab urbe condita). The denomination 206 for this year has been used since the early medieval period, when the Anno Domini calendar era became the prevalent method in Europe for naming years.

== Events ==
=== By place ===
==== Roman Empire ====
- Hadrian's Wall is retaken for the first time, since the Pictish uprising of 180.
- Emperor Septimius Severus goes to Britain, with his sons Caracalla and Geta.

== Births ==
- Trebonianus Gallus, Roman emperor (d. 253)
- Wang Jun (or Shizhi), Chinese general (d. 286)

== Deaths ==
- Gao Gan, Chinese warlord, politician
- Taishi Ci (or Ziyi), Chinese general (b. 166)
- Ying Shao, Chinese politician, writer (b. 140)
