= Green star =

Green star may refer to:

- One of the Esperanto symbols, the green star, or verda stelo
- Green star (astronomy), stars which appear green
- Green Star (Australia), an environmental rating system for buildings in Australia
- Green Star Express, a bus company in the Philippines
- Green Star Media, a British publishing company
- Green Star Line, an American shipping line of 1919–1923
- Green Star Series, five science fantasy novels by Lin Carter
- Sto-Oa, a fictional star that lies at the center of the DC Comics universe
- Michelin Green Star, an award for restaurants with sustainable practices.

== See also ==
- WD J1330+6435, a star with a green color
