= List of lesbian periodicals =

A list of notable lesbian magazines, periodicals, newsletters, and journals.

== Africa ==
=== South Africa ===
- Closet Magazine – c. 1998–?
- Legacy – Lesbian Arts Magazine – Johannesburg, 1990
- The Quarterly
- Sunday's Women – 1990s?
- Umzabalazo – official newsletter of the Coalition of African Lesbians, a continent-wide organization of lesbians in Africa – Johannesburg, 2007–present
- Womyn – 2000–2003

== Asia and the Middle East ==
=== China ===
- Les+ – Beijing, longest running lesbian magazine in China, 2005–2012

=== Indonesia ===
- Goya Lestari – published by group Chandra Kirana, 1993–?

=== Israel ===
- Klaf Hazak – lesbian feminist quarterly from KLaF/CLAF (Kehila Lesbit Feministit/Community of Lesbian Feminists), c.1990–?

=== Japan ===
1970 to 1980

- Feminist Forum: Feminism in Japan and the World (Tokyo, Japan, 1979–1985)
- Hikariguruma – 1978
- Subarashii Onnatachi – Tokyo, lesbian feminist magazine of Wakakusa no Kai – 1976
- Za Daiku (ザ・ダイク) – 1978

1980 to 1990

- Eve & Eve (イブ＆イブ) –
- Regumi Tsūshin (れ組通信) – Tokyo (also known as RST, Regumi Studio Tokyo), 1985–present

1990 to present

- Aniisu (アニース) – (1996–1997, 2001–2003)
- Furiine (Phryné; フリーネ) 1995 (two issues total)
- Kaamira (Carmilla; カーミラ) – (2002–2005)
- Labrys (ラブリス) – continued by LOUD News, 1992–1995?
- LOUD News – published by "Lesbians of Undeniable Drive", 1995–2011?
- Misuto (ミスト／美粋) – Josei ladies comics magazine, 1996–1999

Unknown date

- Lesbian News & Views (English language journal from Japan)

=== Korea ===
- Kkiri-kkiri – Seoul, newsletter of Kkiri-kkiri, now the Lesbian Counseling Center

=== Lebanon ===
- Bekhsoos – magazine of Meem

=== Palestine ===
- Aswat Newsletter – Haifa, published by Aswat Gay Palestinian Women

=== Philippines ===
- My Femme (2009–?)

=== Taiwan ===
- Ai Fu Hao Zi Zai Bao (abbrev. "Ai-Bao") – Taiwan, 1993–?
- Isle Margin – Taiwan
- Lez's Meeting
- Nu pengyou – Taiwan, published by group Wo Men Zhi Jian, 1994–1998?
- Wo Men Zhi Jian Newsletter – Taiwan, 1991–1994

=== Thailand ===
- Anjareesan/Asian Lesbian Network Newsletter – Bangkok, published by Anjaree, 1991–?

== Europe ==
=== Austria ===
1970 to 1980

- Lesben-Frauen-Nachrichten – Vienna, 1979–?

1990 to present

- Female Sequences – frauen lesben kulturHEFTig, Vienna, 1999–?
- Frauenlesben rapidité – Vienna, c. 1997
- Lebenszeichen – Vienna, 2001–?
- LILA Schriften – Vienna, 1995–2001
- Osterreichischer Lesbenrundbrief – Vienna, newsletter of HOSI-Lesben

=== Belgium ===
- Les Cahiers du GRIF – Brussels, newsletter of Groupe de Recherche et d'Information Feministes (GRIF), c. 1975–78

=== Croatia ===
- Just a Girl – Zagreb

=== Czech Republic ===
- Alia – magazine of Klub Lambda
- Promluv – magazine of Promluv group

=== Finland ===
- ILIS Newsletter – Helsinki, International Lesbian Information Service, 1981–1983
- Pärrä – Helsinki, publication of Akanat Lesbian Group, 1982
- Torajyvä – Helsinki, publication of Akanat Lesbian Group, 1983–1988

=== France ===
1970 to 1980

- Quand les Femmes s'aiment – 1978–1980

1980 to 1990

- Bulletin des Archives Lesbiennes (Archives et recherches lesbiennes) – Paris, 1990
- Espaces : bulletin de liaison et d'informations entre lesbiennes radicales – Paris, 1982
- Lesbia: Revue lesbienne d'expression, d'information, d'opinion – Paris, 1982–2012
- Vlasta: fictions/utopies amazoniennes, Paris, by the Collectif Mémoires/Utopies, 1983–1985

1990 to present

- LesBienNées – Nancy
- La Dixieme Muse – Lille, 2003–2013

Unknown date

- Espace Lesbien – Toulouse and the Midi-Pyrénées region, newsletter of Bagdam Espace Lesbien
- Les Lesbianaires: revue de presse
- Lesbrouffe: Voies d'Elles – Grenoble, newsletter of the Association des Lesbiennes de Grenoble
- Penthésilée – Association des Femmes Homosexuelles Européennes (AFHE)

=== Germany ===
1920 to 1970

- Die BIF – Blätter Idealer Frauenfreundschaften, world's first all-female lesbian magazine (1926?–1927)
- Die Freundin, closely affiliated with the League for Human Rights, 1924–1933
- Frauen, Liebe und Leben (1938)
- Frauenliebe (1926–1930)
- Garçonne (1930–1932)
- Ledige Frauen (1928–1929)
- Wir Freundinnen (1951–1952)

1970 to 1980

- Frauen Zeitung – Frauenzentrum – Hamburg, feminist and lesbian newsletter 1976–?
- Lesbenpresse – Berlin, published by the Lesbenpressenkollektiv de LAZ, 1975–1982
- Protokolle – Münster, Verlag Frauenpolitik, 1976–1979
- UKZ: Unsere kleine Zeitung – Berlin/Mannheim, 1974–2001

1980 to 1990

- Infoblatt des Lesbenring – Köln, c. 1984–1996?
- LESBENINFO NETZ – Ulm, 1989–?
- Die Lesbischschwule Presseschau – Berlin, 1982–?
- Tarantel – Bielefeld, Tarantel Kollektiv, 1980–?

1990 to present

- Blattgold – West Berlin, c. 1990s
- EMMA – Germany
- Frau Anders – Weimar, 1990–?
- Ihrsinn – Bochum, radical feminist lesbian magazine, 1990–2004
- Krampfader – Kassel, 1986–?
- L-Mag
- Lesben in NRW – Düsseldorf, c. 2005
- Lesbenstich – Dortmund
- Lescriba: Das lesbische Literaturmagazin – Sinzing, 2004–?
- Lespress – das andere Frauenmagazin – 1995–2006
- nur sie: Lesben/Frauen-Kulturmagazin für Nürnberg/Fürth/Erlangen – Nürnberg, 1999–?

Unknown year

- Bulletin des Archives Lesbiennes

=== Greece ===
- Labrys – Athens, 1980–?
- Lettres Eoliennes: Revue Bimensuelle d'Art Lesbien – Athens, c. 1980s

=== Hungary ===
- Dyke Magazin – 2007
- qLit
- Labrisz Lesbian Newsletter – published by the Labrisz Lesbian Association, c. 1990s

=== Ireland ===
- Gaelick – online lesbian periodical
- LINC: Lesbians in Cork – Cork, c. 2001

=== Italy ===
- Bollettino cel C.L.I. – Rome, paper of Centro Feminista Separatista, c. 1981–1991
- Towanda: appunti, spunti e spuntini lesbici – Milan, 1994

=== Lithuania ===
- SAPPHO – Vilnius, quarterly magazine of lesbian organization Sappho

=== Netherlands ===
1970 to 1980

- Amarant – 1972–present
- Paarse September. Alternatieve Vrouwenkrant – 1972–1974

1980 to 1990

- Diva – 1982–1986, switched to Zij aan Zij in the mid-1990s
- ILIS newsletter – Amsterdam, International Lesbian Information Service, 1980–81, 1987–1998
- Lesbisch Archivaria – Lesbisch Archief Leeuwarden, 1982–?
- Lust en gratie: lesbisch cultureel tijdschrift – Amsterdam, c. 1983–1987
- Nieuwsbrief – Amsterdam, Lesbisch Archief Amsterdam, 1983–1994

1990 to 2000

- Wild Side Magazine – Amsterdam, Leiden

1990 to present

- Girls Like Us – Amsterdam, 2005–present
- Zij aan Zij – Rijswijk, 1998–present

=== Poland ===
- Sigma – Silesia, published one issue only, 1992
- Violet Pulse – Gdańsk
- Lesbilans - Katowice, yearly since 2024

=== Portugal ===
1980 to 1990

- Artemísia – Porto, feminist magazine supportive of lesbians, 1985

1990 to present

- Lesbiana – published by Grupo de mulheres da associação ILGA-Portugal, 1999
- LILÁS – Lisbon, 1993
- Organa – Lisbon, first lesbian magazine in Portugal, 1991–1993?
- Zona Livre – 1997

=== Romania ===
- ENOLA – published by Accept, 2006–?

=== Russia ===
- Pinx – 2006–present

=== Serbia ===
- labris: Lezbejske novine – Belgrade, 1994–?
- Novosadska Lezbejska Organizacija Newsletter – Novi Sad

=== Slovenia ===
- Lesbo – Ljubljana, Magazine of ŠKUC-LL Group, c. 1988

=== Spain ===
- Caladona: Un espai de dones per a dones – Barcelona, Caladona, lesbian magazine in Catalan language, 1993–present
- Laberint: revista de mujeros para mujeros – Barcelona, c. 1992–1994
- Mujeres y Punto – Madrid, newsletter of CRECUL, Comité Reivindicativo Cultural de Lesbianas de Madrid
- Sales: Revista Lesbica – Barcelona, Revista Sales
- Towanda! Revista Lesbica – Zaragoza, 2002–?
- MagLes Magazine – Barcelona, 2012–present

=== Sweden ===
- Lesbisk Feministiska – Stockholm, c. 1984–1988
- Lila perspektiv – Stockholm, c. 1981–1984

=== Switzerland ===
1930-1950

- Freundschaftsbanner - Zurich, 1932-1942 (from 1937 as Menschenrecht, changed in 1942 to male-only Der Kreis)

1970–1980

- Lesbenfront – Zurich, 1974–1985

1980–1990

- CLIT 007 – lesbian feminist magazine, 1981-1986
- Frau Ohne Herz – Zurich, 1985–1995
- ELLA: Das Lesbenforum – Basel, 1985–1993?
- ILIS Bulletin – Geneva, International Lesbian Information Service, Clit International, 1984–86

1990–2000

- die – Lesbenzeitschrift aus der Schweiz, Zurich, 1996–2004
- Ellas ketchup – Basel, 1993–?

2000–present

- Skipper – Zürich, 2004–2005

=== Turkey ===
- "Öte-ki-ben (From Woman to Woman) – Ankara, Turkey / Frankfurt am Main, Germany, 2001–?

=== Ukraine ===
- Лесби Портал – lesbian feminist publication, 2018–present

=== United Kingdom ===
Prior to 1970

- Arena Three – London, Minorities Research Group, 1963–1972
- Kenric Newsletter – c. 1960s–present
- Minorities Research Group Newsletter

1970 to 1980

- Lesbians Come Together – London, c. 1972
- Medusa: Journal of the Bradford Lesbian Feminist Surrealist Group – c. 1978–?
- Move – Bristol, c 1970s–?
- Sappho – London, newsletter of the Southwark Lesbian Network; for lesbians only, 1971–?
- Sequel: A Feminist Magazine for Isolated Lesbians – London, c. 1979
- Zero: Anarcha-feminist Newsmagazine – London, 1978–?

1980 to 1990

- Bristol Radical Lesbian Feminist Magazine 1986–1990
- Camden Lesbian Centre Newsletter/ Camden Black Lesbian Group Newsletter – London, available in both print and cassette, 1987–1991
- Diversion: Six issues produced 1986-1987
- Gemma – London; lesbians with and without disabilities, all ages; available in print or on cassette, c.1980
- Gossip: A Journal of Lesbian Feminist Ethics – London, for lesbians only; Onlywomen Press, c. 1986–?
- Lesbian Information Service Newsletter – Leicester, available in both print and cassette, 1987–1989
- Lesbian International – Leicester, for lesbians only, available in print and cassette, 1989–1990
- Lesbian Archive and Information Centre Newsletter – London, Lesbian Archive and Information Centre (LAIC), c. 1985–?
- Outwrite — London, 1982-1988
- Quim Magazine: For Dykes of All Sexual Persuasions – London, 1989–1995, plus one issue in 2001
- Spinster: Feminist Creative Work with an Emphasis on the Work of Lesbians – London, 1982–?

After 1990

- The Axe – Bradford lesbian newsletter, 1996–1997
- B.I.D (Behaviour, Identity, Desire) – online monthly magazine (99p subscription), November 2011
- crAve – bi-monthly magazine, 2008–present
- Diva – London, 1994–present
- Dykenosis : the newsletter of LesBeWell - Birmingham, 1994–1998
- G3 Magazine – London, free monthly national publication
- Lesbian London – London, also released on cassette tape, 1992–1993
- Lesbian Talk Issues – Scarlet Press, 1992–1996
- Look out - Nottingham, Lesbian Centre, 1996-2015
- Shebang – London, 1992–?
- Velvet

Year unknown

- Artemis: For Women who Love Women – London, magazine of the Artemis Club
- Lesbian Zone – Manchester
- Lesbians in Education – London
- Lesbians in Libraries – England
- Older Lesbians Network Newsletter – London

=== Wales / Cymru ===
- Cardiff Women's Liberation Newsletter – Cardiff, "for wimmin only", c. 1970s–1980s
- Older Lesbian Network Newsletter
- Women Come Together: Swansea Women's Liberation Newsletter – Swansea, c. 1970s
- WomenZone: Connecting lesbians across Wales – Swansea, c. 1990s

== Oceania ==
=== New Zealand ===
1970 to 1980

- Circle, later Lesbian Feminist Circle – Wellington, "for lesbians only", collectively produced 1973–1985
- Spiral – literary and arts journal for women, founded in 1976 by Heather McPherson; the press also published Keri Hulme's Booker Prize-winning novel The Bone People in 1984
- Wellington Lesbian Network – Wellington, newsletter; for lesbians only, c. 1979–1999

1980 to 1990

- Bitches, Witches, & Dykes – Auckland, 1980–1981
- Glad Rag – Wellington – for lesbians only, c. 1983
- Lesbians in Print (LIP) – Auckland, for women only, 1985–1991
- Sapphic star – Auckland, c. 1989–1991
- Tamaki Makaurau lesbian newsletter – Auckland, New Zealand, c. 1990–present

After 1990

- The Laughing Medusa – lesbian literary magazine, edited by Kedy Kristal and Takoel Akuni, c. 1991–1993

=== Australia ===
1970 to 1980

- A. L. M. Newsletter – Melbourne, newsletter of the Australian Lesbian Movement, c. 1971
- Blatant Lesbianism – Sydney, c. 1978–?
- Patchwork newsletter – Brisbane, c. 1978?

1980 to 1990

- Australian Lesbian Diary – Melbourne, c. 1987
- Sage: the separatist age – Australia, lesbian separatist periodical; title was formerly Seps Down Under; "A cauldron of lesbian separatist thought dreams and visions", c. 1990–1992
- S.E.P.S. Down Under (Newsletter of Separatists Eroding Patriarch Sincerely) – Waucope, c. 1989
- Wicked Women (subtitled Dyke Decadence) – Australia – 1988–1996, 28 issues

1990 to 2000

- Australian Asian Lesbian News – Sydney, c. 1991
- Banshee – Melbourne, c. 1992
- Dis-Ease – Sydney, c. 1993
- Elam – Newcastle, newsletter of the Hunter Lesbian Group, c. 1998
- Geelong Lesbian Group – Geelong, c. 1999–?
- Hell Bent (Wicked Women Publications) Redfern, Sydney, c. 1991
- Interlesbian – Melbourne, multi-cultural lesbian news, c. 1994
- Journal of Australian Lesbian Feminist Studies – Haymarket, New South Wales, 1991–1995
- Labrys – Melbourne, 1990–1992
- Lesbian Network – Rozelle, Lesbian Network Collective, c. 1990s
- Lesbians on the Loose – now LOTL – Darlinghurst, 1990–present
- Lesbiana – Fitzroy, c. 1992
- Lilac – Launceston, Tasmania, 1993–1996
- olderdykes.org – Sydney, online magazine for lesbians over 40
- Out Loud – Eltham, women's cultural magazine focussing on lesbian and feminist content, c. 1992–?
- ShOut Newsletter – Melbourne, c. 1994
- Suncoast Lesbian Information Press – Queensland, c. 1995–?
- Women Out West – Perth, 1999–present, WOW

2000 to present

- Butch is Not a Dirty Word – Melbourne, 2017–present
- Cherrie – national
- SASS Magazine Melbourne
- Slit magazine, 2002-
- velvet Tipt – Melbourne, magazine for lesbians in Victoria and Tasmania, 2005–2006

Year unknown

- The Bloody Rag – Lismore
- Grapevine – Western Australia
- Lesbian News – National Magazine
- Lesbian Territory – Northern Territory
- Lesbian Times – North Adelaide
- Outloud – Melbourne

== South America ==
=== Argentina ===
- Cuaderno de existensia Lesbiana – (CEL) Argentina c. 1987
- Fulanas – Argentina, 2000

=== Brazil ===
- Chana com Chana – São Paulo, published by the Grupo de Ação Lésbica-Feminista, c.1979–1987
- Femme
- Rede Outro Olhar

=== Chile ===
- Amazonas – Chile
- Baruyera – Chile, Colectiva Lésbica Mafalda
- Hilando Destinos – Chile, published by the Colectiva Lésbica feminista Moiras
- Lazos – Chile
- Montedevenus: Mujeres que aman Mujeres – online magazine
- Rompiendo el Silencio

=== Peru ===
- otro lado de la luna

== North America ==
=== Canada ===
1970 to 1980

- Dyke – Montreal, Quebec, 1977
- Grapevine: Newsletter of the Lesbian Mother's Defence Fund – Toronto, Ontario, c. 1979–1883
- Lesbian Canada Lesbienne – Halifax, Nova Scotia, published by the Atlantic Provinces Political Lesbians for Equality (APPLE), 1977/1978
- Lesbian Feminists of Montreal Newsletter – Montreal, Quebec, published by the Lesbian Feminists of Montreal, 1977
- Lesbian Organization of Toronto (L.O.O.T.) Newsletter – Toronto, Ontario, 1977–1980
- Lesbian Perspective – Toronto, Ontario, published by the Lesbian Organization of Toronto (LOOT), 1979–1980
- Lesbians/lesbiennes – Toronto, Ontario, 1979–1981
- Lesbomonde – Montreal, Quebec 1973–1974
- London Lesbian Collective News – London, Ontario, published by the LCC, 1977–1978
- Long Time Coming – Montreal, Quebec, published by Montreal Gay Women (originally women's committee of Gay McGill University), 1973–1976
- The Other Woman – Toronto, Ontario, feminist and lesbian news magazine, 1972–?
- Pedestal: Lesbian-Feminist Newspaper – Vancouver, B.C., 1975, women's liberation paper, reorganized briefly in 1975 as a lesbian feminist paper
- Sisters Lightship – Halifax, Nova Scotia, 1978
- Three of Cups – Toronto, Ontario, 1976–1978
- Wages Due Lesbians – Toronto, Ontario, c. 1977–78
- Waves: a Lesbian Feminist Newsletter – Victoria, BC, 1978–1979

1980 to 1990

- Amazones d'Hier, Lesbiennes d'Aujourd'hui – Montreal, Quebec, for lesbians only, 1982-2013
- Association of Women's Music and Culture – Toronto, published by Womynly Way Productions, c. 1989
- Ça s'attrape!! – Montreal, Quebec, 1982-1984
- Communique'Elles – 1980s
- Diversity, the Lesbian Rag – Vancouver, B.C., published by the Diversity Collective 1988–1991
- Flagrant – Vancouver, B.C., 1981–1984
- Furie Lesbienne / Lesbian Fury – Ottawa, Ontario, for lesbians only, c. 1985–1995
- KINESIS: news about women that's not in the dailies – Vancouver, British Columbia, published by the Vancouver Status of Women, a non-sectarian feminist voice covering some lesbian issues, c. 1980s/1990s
- Lavender Sheets – Toronto, Ontario, published by the Lesbian Organization of Toronto (LOOT), c. 1980
- Lavender Times – Calgary, Alberta, project of the Calgary Womyn's Collective, 1987–?
- Lesbian Newsletter – Regina, SK, c. 1985
- LesbiaNews/LNews – Victoria, BC,1989–98
- Les Sourcières – Montréal QC, 1980-1982
- L'Évidente Lesbienne - Montréal, QC, 1984-1990
- The Open Door: Rural Lesbian Newsletter – Burns Lake/Terrace, British Columbia/Nelson, B.C., 1983–1986
- The Radical Reviewer – Vancouver, B.C., Lesbian Literary Collective magazine, 1980–1983
- Treize! Revue Lesbienne – Montreal, Quebec, 1984–2005
- Web of Crones – Vancouver, BC, 1986
- Womonspace News: Our Voice in the Lesbian Community – Edmonton, Alberta, 1983–?
- Zami Newsletter – Toronto, Ontario, c. 1987–88

1990 to 2000

- Au-dela de l'invisibilite: le bulletin de la Collective Lesbienne – Ottawa, Ontario, published by the Collective Lesbienne, c. 1998
- Chicklist: Proudly Peddling Chick Power, Pleasure and Polemic – Toronto, published by the Pink Triangle Press, c. 1997
- Gazelle: le magazine des lesbiennes – Montreal, Quebec, 1992–?
- Limbo: Lesbian Bi-Monthly Magazine – London, Ontario, published by Limbo, 1999
- SamiYoni: a ioumal for lesbians of South Asian Descent – Toronto, 1993–1994
- Sensible Shoes News: The Newsletter of Saskatchewan's Lesbian Communities – Regina, mid-1990s
- Siren – Toronto, Ontario, "Irresistibly tempting, for lesbians", 1995–2004
- Voices for Lesbian Survival: By and For Lesbians – Kenora, Ontario, published by the Voices Collective, c. 1995

After 2000

- Femmes entre elles – Montreal, Quebec, 2002-2012.
- No More Potlucks – Montreal, Quebec, ?–present (bilingual French/English online magazine)
- QueeriesMag.com – Toronto, Ontario, 2010–present (online lifestyle magazine)
- Sapho Magazine : Le magazine des lesbiennes de la Capitale, 2005-2012- Québec, Québec
- Lez Spread the Word (LSTW) - Montréal, Quebec, 2016–present

=== Mexico ===
- Amantes de la Luna – CIDHOM – Mexico City, 1994–?
- Amazona – Mexico, published by Colectivo de Lesbianas del F H A R (Frente Homosexual de Accion Revolucionaria), c.1979 (Coordinadora Lesbica)
- Del otro lado – magazine of Grupo de Madres Lesbianas 2, c. 1996
- HIMEN Fanzine – Mexico City, published by Colectiva HIMEN
- Les Voz, Mexico's lesbian feminist magazine- Mexico, 1994–present

== See also ==
=== Lesbian ===
- Lesbian feminism
- Lesbian fiction
- Lesbian organizations
- Lesbian separatism

=== LGBT ===
- List of LGBT periodicals
- List of LGBT-related organizations
