= Gemma (organisation) =

English lesbian magazine and social group

- Formation: 1976
- Type: Organisation for lesbians with disabilities
- Purpose: Social networking and support group
- Headquarters: England
- Region served: England
- Official language: English

GEMMA is a magazine and a social group founded in 1976 whose mandate is to provide a "friendship and support group for disabled lesbians in England".

The organisation was founded by members of lesbian organisation Sappho and mixed organisation Campaign for Homosexual Equality, including Elsa Beckett. Gemma's member newsletter was published in regular print, in braille as well as cassette format.

In her essay Unearthing Our Past: Engaging with Diversity at the Museum of London, Raminder Kaur describes a leaflet promoting the activities of Gemma, which is a part of the Museum of London collection, as "crucial to exploring the theme of multiple identities or difference within difference".

== See also ==
- List of lesbian periodicals
