= Esme Langley =

British writer (1919–1991)

- Born: 26 August 1919; Guisborough, Yorkshire, England, UK
- Died: 20 August 1991 (aged 71); St Albans City Hospital, Hertfordshire, England, UK
- Other names: Ann Bruce
- Occupation: Writer

Esme Ross-Langley (née George, pseudonym Ann Bruce; 26 August 1919, in Guisborough, Yorkshire – 20 August 1991, in Hertfordshire, England), was a British writer, best known as the founder of the Minorities Research Group and Arena Three.

== Early life ==
Esme was the only child of Ivy George, who named her Esmé after a character in a book.

Her father William Gwyn Thomas was an international rugby player. He emigrated to the US in 1923 but Esme's mother declined his invitation to follow later. Esme was brought up by her maternal grandparents Charles Henry George and Annie George (née Langley) in Preston, Lancashire. She enjoyed cycling and swimming; a childhood hero was Johnny Weissmuller in the Tarzan films.

== Education ==
At school Esmé took an interest in languages, English in particular; she learned Latin, French and German and wanted to study Ancient Greek too but there were no classes available to her at the time.

After passing her Matriculation (University entrance) in 1935 at the age of 16 her formal education ended. According to her semi-autobiographical novel, Esmé was enjoying life in London with a friend's family and refused to return to school for her final year of English Honours. The son of the family proposed marriage but his mother did not approve so they broke up. At the age of 17 she was on her own, living and working in London, and through necessity living a frugal life. She volunteered to serve in the Army in 1939 and after the war, as a single mother, was unable to take up her university place.

Later Esmé studied Italian for fun, Swahili and Chichewa while working in Malawi, Spanish during her retirement in Spain and, just before her final illness at the age of 72, she was studying Russian.

== World War II ==
Why Should I Be Dismayed? – Written by Esme Langley under the 'Ann Bruce' pseudonym

Esmé served in the Auxiliary Territorial Service (ATS) during World War II, teaching typing and shorthand. While grateful that her typing prowess kept her in work, she was irritated by employers who ignored her other skills. For example, she regularly completed difficult crosswords like Ximenes and Azed, but when she applied to join the Bletchley Park team working on the German Enigma cipher, her military unit would not release her.

After her release from the British Army in November 1945 ("Military Conduct: Exemplary") Esmé was penniless, homeless and pregnant.

Her book, Why should I be dismayed?, about life as a single parent was recommended reading for social workers at the time.

== BBC ==
Esmé got a job with the BBC Monitoring unit at Caversham Park near Reading and spent several years exploring languages and playing squash and chess with the Russian monitors there. She had another two children, by a Yugoslav journalist, but never wanted to live with him. In 1956 she arranged a mortgage, bought a house in Bromley, Kent and took in lodgers. There she met an African called Tchum and they considered marriage; Esmé decided against it on the grounds of likely prejudices against her existing and future children.

== Arena Three ==
Esmé was a vocal supporter of minorities of all kinds. In 1963, after working for Sylvester Stein on the London Property Letter, she founded her own magazine publishing enterprise, the Minorities Research Group, from her basement flat in Hampstead. On legal advice she was the sole proprietor so that she could not be charged with statutory conspiracy. She published Mainland (for the homeless) which was unsuccessful, and then Arena Three (magazine) (for lesbians) which took over her life for many years.

== Malawi ==
When Esmé considered that Arena Three had accomplished most of its aims, she moved to Malawi in 1971 with an Austin Champ and took a two-year secretarial assignment in the Office of the President. While there she learned basic Chichewa and Swahili. She named her dog St Leonards as a derogatory but deniable reference to Hastings Banda and his repressive regime. After an outspoken friend of hers disappeared, Esmé resigned her post a few months early and with her eldest son's fiancée set off on a six-week tour of Southern Africa, smuggling a Jehovah's Witness to safety over the border on the way. Her Austin Champ broke down early in the journey but they continued on foot and hitchhiking through Mozambique, Zimbabwe and South Africa before returning home to England.

== Music and letters ==
After decades of smoking, Esmé had chronic bronchitis and emphysema. For health reasons she moved in 1986 from Hertfordshire to Torrevieja, Spain, and pursued her hobbies of Mozart, writing and gardening for her remaining years. She died on 20 August 1991 in St Albans City Hospital of complications following a stroke.
