= MRG =

MRG can mean

- Millennium Research Group
- Minorities Research Group
- Minority Rights Group International
- Mouvement des Radicaux de Gauche, later Left Radical Party, France
- Red Hat Messaging/Realtime/Grid
- Mad River Glen, ski area in Fayston, Vermont
- The IATA code for Mareeba Airfield in Queensland, Australia
- A government-provided Minimum Revenue Guarantee, offsetting volume risk in a public–private partnership
