= Libby Jones =

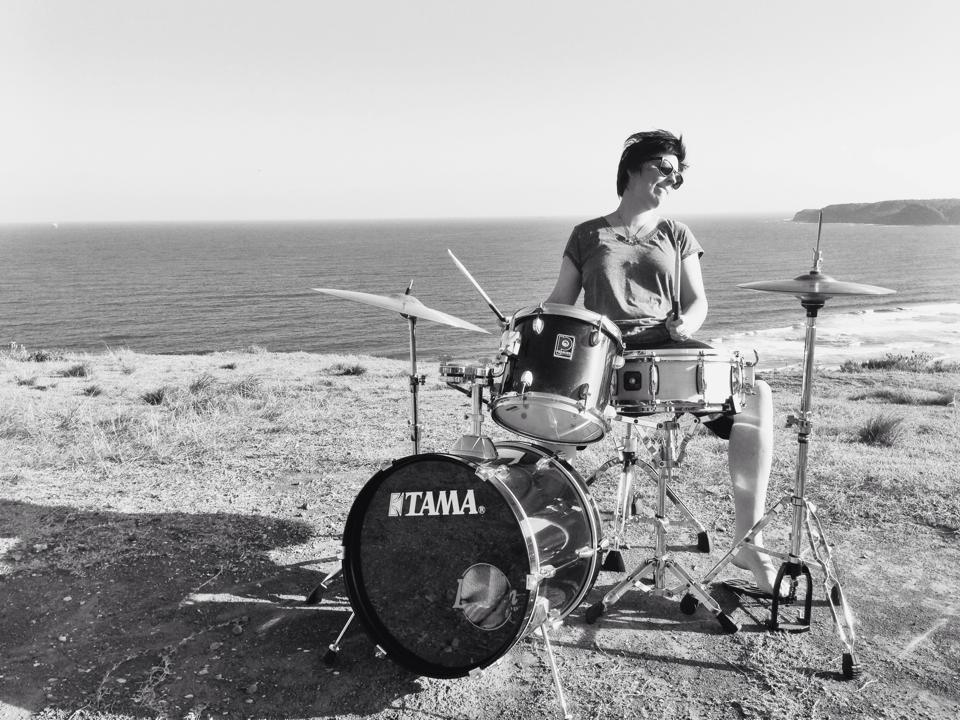
- Drummer Libby Jones.

Background information
- Born: Elizabeth Jones; Newcastle, New South Wales, Australia
- Genres: Alternative rock, grunge, pop, folk, acoustic, punk rock, soft rock, hard rock, progressive rock
- Instruments: Drums, guitar, harmonica, vocals
- Years active: 1995–present

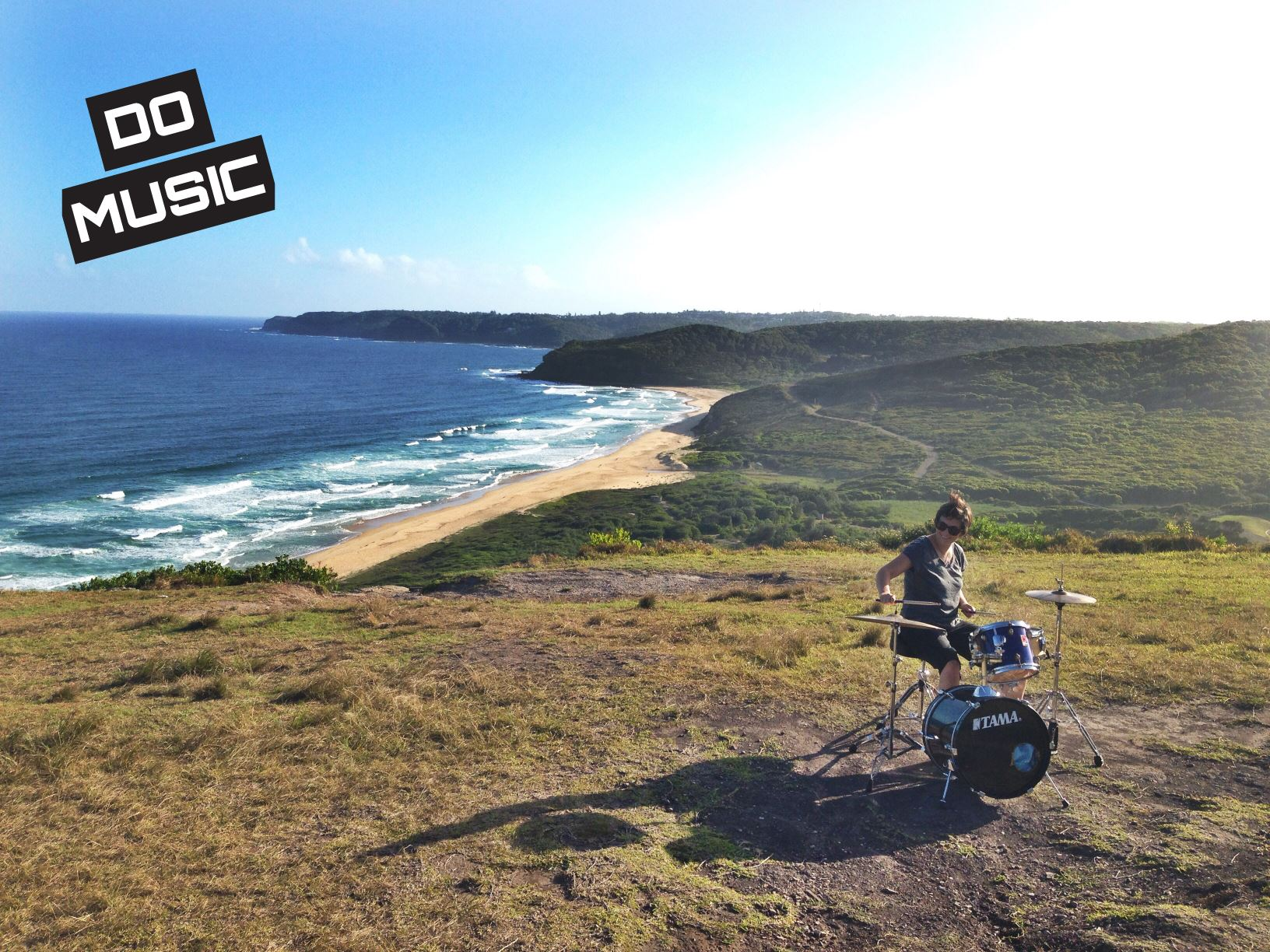
Libby Jones drums on a cliff in Newcastle, NSW.

Libby Jones is an Australian musician who teaches music in Newcastle, NSW. Her primary instrument is drums and percussion, though she also plays guitar, harmonica and on occasion, the ukulele.

== Hit Like A Girl Australian Ambassador 2015 ==
Libby was chosen as the 2015 Hit Like A Girl international ambassador for Australia. Her role as ambassador involves promoting female drumming (and the competition) nationally.

== Hit Like A Girl 2014 ==
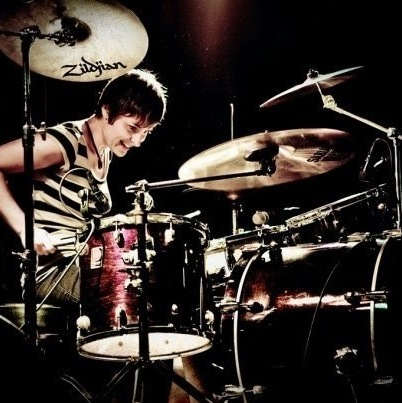
Libby Jones drums

Libby represented Australia, competing in the Hit Like A Girl 2014 international female drumming competition with her drum cover of Rush's YYZ.

Libby received support from the LGBT community and was featured in an article for Australian Lesbian Magazine Lesbians on the Loose.

The Newcastle Herald featured an article on Libby helping to promote International Women's Day, quoting Libby

‘‘I know when I was starting out, I was the only one I knew playing drums at all,’’ says Jones, who’s played since the age of 12. ‘‘It hasn’t really changed; we’re still outnumbered 99 to one.’’

== Band History ==
1995–2002 – Twin Psyche (Drums)

1999–2001 – Heddy's Revenge (Drums)

2002–2007 – Old Sound Central (Drums)

2007–2009 – Girl in the Picture (Guitar & Harmonica)

2009–2010 – Vamp (Drums)

2010–2011 – MixTape Memoirs (Guitar, Harmonica, Percussion & Vocals)

2011–2013 – The May Fields (Guitar, Harmonica, Percussion & Vocals)

2014-2015 - Gen-X (Percussion)

2018 - Now - Pretty Irresistible (Percussion)
