= Pink star (astronomy) =

White dwarfs with pink and purple modelled colours

Simulated surface colour of white dwarf WD J0902+2010

In astronomy, a pink star is a star whose perceived or modelled colour is pink or a related hue. These shades are not separate stellar classifications, but describe different appearances that can result from a star's spectrum and atmospheric properties.

Most ordinary stars have colours broadly resembling blackbody radiation, ranging from orange through white to blue as their effective temperatures increase. However, certain white dwarfs have unusual atmospheric compositions that alter their spectra sufficiently to produce pink or purple modelled colours.

A 2026 study by Mark A. Hollands and colleagues documented a variety of these colours among carbon-rich white dwarfs, including objects with pale purple, vivid pink and reddish-pink appearances.

== Atmospheric composition ==
Pink and purple stars are not a distinct stellar class. Rather, these colours can arise when a star's spectrum differs sufficiently from that of a typical star, causing its light to be perceived as pink, magenta, lilac or purple. This is particularly evident among certain white dwarfs, whose atmospheric compositions produce unusual absorption features that alter the distribution of visible light.

Many of these objects are carbon-rich DQ white dwarfs, including peculiar DQ (DQpec) white dwarfs. Their spectra contain molecular absorption bands produced by diatomic carbon (C_{2}), particularly the Swan bands. These bands absorb light at specific wavelengths, changing the balance of colours reaching an observer. When the resulting spectrum is converted into a modelled colour, the white dwarf can appear pink or purple rather than white or blue.

Unusual stellar colours are not limited to carbon-rich white dwarfs. Other white dwarfs have atmospheres containing elements such as calcium and sodium, whose absorption features can also alter their visible spectra and produce atypical chromaticities. However, the presence of these elements does not necessarily make a star pink or purple; the resulting colour depends on the combined effect of its spectral features.

== Examples ==
The following list illustrates a range of pink-colored stars mentioned in the 2026 study. The shade descriptions are approximate visual labels for the published sRGB colour codes.

White dwarf	Approximate modelled shade	sRGB hex code
WD J0136+2004	Pale purple or lavender	#E3D1FF
WD J0145+2317	Pale blue-lavender	#D5D8FF
WD J0320−0716	Pale magenta-pink	#FFD2F7
WD J0740+1810	Pale lavender	#E4E2FF
WD J0805+0724	Pale peach-pink	#FFE0D7
WD J0808+4640	Pale pink	#FFB4B6
WD J0820+5204	Pink-lilac	#FFD8FB
WD J0832−0408	Magenta-pink	#FFC7F4
WD J0852+0428	Pale blue-lavender	#C4CAFF
WD J0856+4513	Lavender	#C7C3FF
WD J0902+2010	Pink	#FFA9B2
WD J0935+0030	Rose-pink	#FFB1BE
WD J1011+2845	Vivid salmon-pink	#FF8775
WD J1028+3512	Coral-pink	#FF8C81
WD J1113+0146	Pink	#FFABC8
WD J1141+3836	Rose-pink	#FFB2CC
WD J1159−1300	Pale magenta or lilac	#FFD4FD
WD J1201+3400	Very pale pink	#FFE3EE
WD J1233+0824	Near-white lavender	#F9EEFF
WD J1237+4156	Rose-pink	#FFBFE2
WD J1309+4445	Pale lavender	#E5DBFF
WD J1311+2923	Pink	#FFACC4
WD J1333+0016	Vivid pink	#FD9D83
WD J1355+3636	Pale blue-lavender	#D4D5FF
WD J1356−0009	Pale lilac	#EAE3FF
WD J1457+2107	Pale pink	#FFE7F1
WD J1501+2100	Pale pink	#FFDAE9
WD J1554+0336	Very pale lavender	#F0EFFF
WD J1614+1729	Pale salmon-pink	#FFCEC9
WD J1835+6429	Very pale blush	#FDF1ED
WD J2310−0057	Pale lavender	#E1D9FF

=== Notable examples ===
==== WD J0902+2010 ====
WD J0902+2010 is a carbon-rich white dwarf whose modelled appearance is a vivid pink. It has a helium-dominated outer envelope and a deep convection zone that reaches the white dwarf's core, transporting carbon towards the surface. The resulting carbon molecules absorb light across the visible spectrum, including blue, green and yellow wavelengths, contributing to the star's colour.

==== WD J1011+2845 ====
WD J1011+2845, also known as LHS 2229 or LP 315–42, is a nearby peculiar DQ white dwarf whose modelled colour is deep salmon-pink. Its spectrum contains deep, distorted Swan bands, which suppress much of the visible flux between approximately 400 and 600 nanometres. The distortion has been associated with high atmospheric density and may also be affected by a strong magnetic field. The resulting spectrum produces one of the most distinctive reddish colours in the studied sample.

==== WD J1333+0016 ====
WD J1333+0016 is a peculiar DQ white dwarf whose calculated colour is a vivid pink. Its chromaticity lies relatively far from the blackbody locus, making its modelled colour more saturated than those of many comparable objects. Its spectrum has distorted Swan bands similar to those of WD J1011+2845, but a greater fraction of its flux is emitted at wavelengths below 450 nanometres, resulting in a different shade.

== See also ==
- Green star (astronomy)
