= Sylvester Stein =

South African magazine editor (1920–2015)

Sylvester Stein (25 December 1920 – 28 December 2015) was a South African writer, publisher and athlete.

== Biography ==
Stein was born in Cape Town, South Africa, and grew up in Durban, son of a mathematics professor Philip Stein and Lily Rolnick. His sister and brother are both life scientists.

After completing his education as an electrical engineer, Stein volunteered for the Royal Navy during the Second World War. He served mainly on minesweepers, and later moved to the UK to work on the degaussing of ships, a defensive measure against magnetic mines.

Demobbed and married to Jenny Hutt, a Londoner, he returned to South Africa in 1947, where his four children were born. He worked on the Johannesburg Rand Daily Mail as a reporter, and later became editor of Drum magazine.

At this time, Stein was a friend and associate of many leading figures in the African National Congress (ANC). By 1957, the South African government was beginning to prosecute and imprison political dissenters and Stein, like many others, took the decision to emigrate. Nonetheless, he maintained contact with ANC exiles and helped rejuvenate the party's finances prior to its assumption of power in 1994.

He resumed journalistic work in London, including stints on Reynolds News and the News Chronicle, but soon grew dissatisfied and formed his own publishing company. This company, Stonehart Publications, introduced many innovative newsletters and marketing concepts to the somewhat staid British publishing environment. Reflecting his interest in athletics, in October 1990 he founded the sports performance periodical Peak Performance, and later Sports Injury Bulletin. Both publications continue under the ownership of Green Star Media.

Apart from his business interests, Stein published several books, both fiction and non-fiction. His 1958 novel, Second Class Taxi, was banned in South Africa for more than 20 years.

Stein's book about his time as editor of Drum magazine, Who Killed Mr Drum?, was turned into a play, co-written with Fraser Grace. It opened at the Riverside Studios in September 2005, directed by Paul Robinson, with Sello Maake Ka-Ncube as Can Themba. The title is a reference to the 1957 murder of investigative journalist Henry "Mr Drum" Nxumalo. In 2006 a play co-written with his late colleague, Robert Troop, entitled This is your Captain Speaking, was produced at the Pentameters Theatre in Hampstead.

Stein's other achievements were in the athletic stadium, where he won numerous medals in masters athletics events worldwide. At the age of 60 he won a gold medal in the 200m at the World Masters Athletics championships in Christchurch, New Zealand. He competed against, among others, US Senator Alan Cranston. In 2003, at the age of 82, he won two gold medals in the British Masters Championships.

Stein was President of the British Masters Federation for a number of years. At the age of 89, he had a pulse rate of 52, which is 20 points below the national average.

== Bibliography ==
=== Non-fiction ===
- The Running Guide to Keeping Fit (Corgi, 1986)
- 99 Ways to Reach 100 (Century Hutchinson, 1987)
- Who Killed Mr Drum? (Corvo, 1999)

=== Novels ===
- Second Class Taxi (Faber, 1958)
- Old Letch (Faber, 1959)
- What the World Owes Me by Mary Bowes (Faber, 1960
- The Bewilderness (House, 1976)

== See also ==
- London Property Letter
