= Gateways club =

Lesbian nightclub in London, 1936–1985

Coordinates: 51.4863°N 0.1714°W

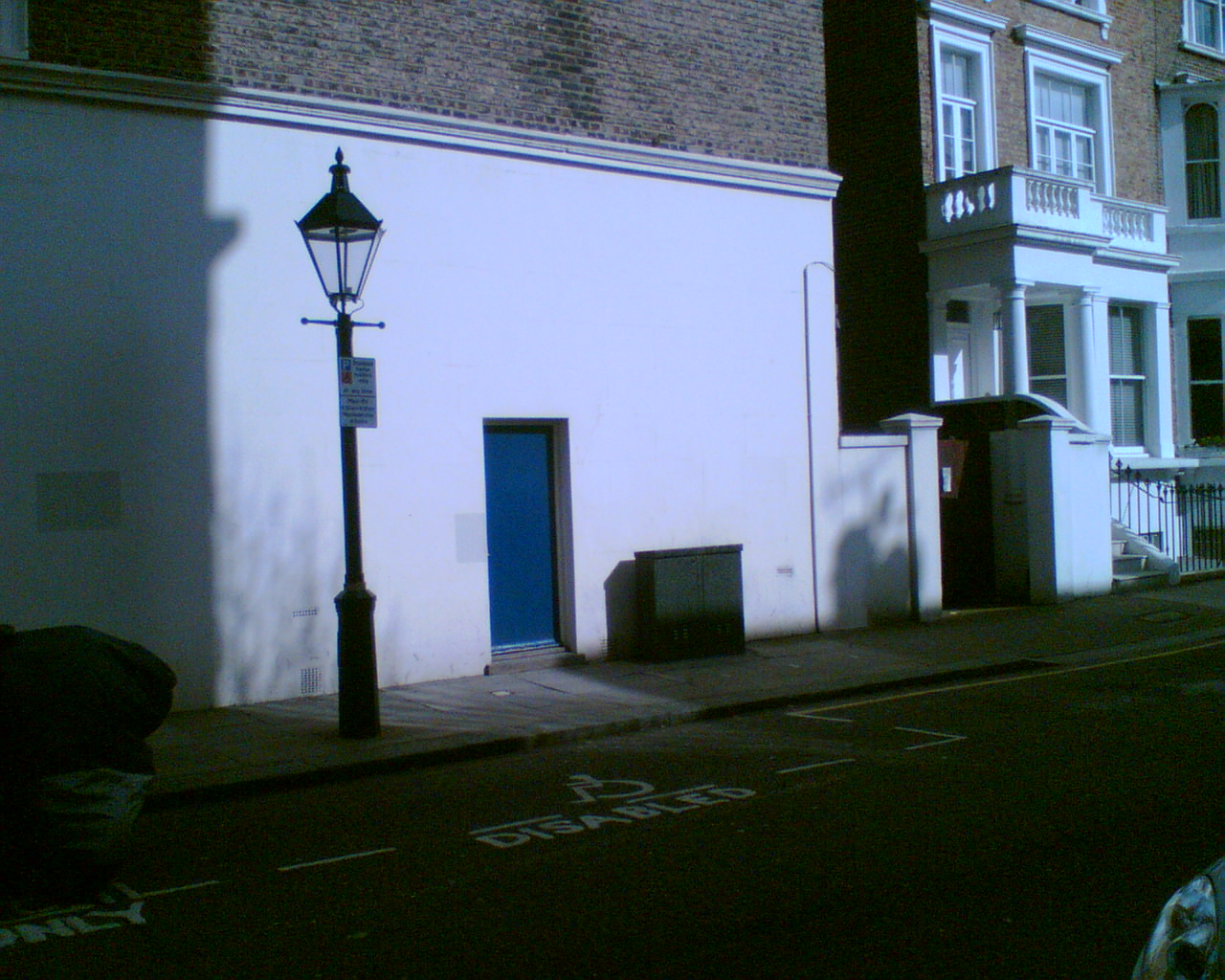
The door of the Gateways Club (then painted blue), taken March 2007

The Gateways club was a noted lesbian nightclub located at 239 King's Road on the corner of Bramerton Street, Chelsea, London, England. It was the longest-surviving such club in the world, open by 1931 and legally becoming a members club in 1936. In 1967, it became for women only. It closed on Saturday 21 September 1985 after a period of only opening for a few hours each weekend.

The final non-public night was the following Monday, as the Kenric lesbian group had booked the venue for a social event, and longstanding members removed the nameplate from the front door as a souvenir, amongst other fixtures and fittings.

== Early history ==
Ted Ware (1898–1979) took over the club in 1943 after allegedly winning it in a poker game. Ted was a well travelled man who, unusually for the time, had raised his son from his second marriage by himself. He allowed the club to become a meeting place for the Chelsea Arts Club and was welcoming to the wide variety of people who lived in the area. The club had many gay and lesbian regulars, and was also frequented by black Caribbean people, such as Chester Harriott, who played jazz piano there, and by members of other minority groups that were discriminated against elsewhere.

Ted married Gina Cerrato (1922–2001), an actress, in July 1953 when he was 55 and she was 31 years old. Gina had been born in Italy in 1922, but had grown up in Cardiff. She came to London to pursue her acting career and appeared in several films, before meeting Ted in The Gateways in 1947. She and Ted had one daughter together, before Gina gradually took over running the club during the late 1950s.

Smithy (1933–1993) first arrived at the Gateways in 1959 and eventually went on to co-manage the club with Gina. She was originally from California and as a member of the American Air Force, was posted to a base in Ruislip, London. She decided that she wanted to stay in London with Gina and Ted and had an arranged marriage in 1962, which enabled her to stay in the United Kingdom.

== Gateways lesbian life ==
"The Gates" was one of the few places in the UK where lesbians could meet openly during the 40s, 50s and 60s. Lesbians and bisexuals flocked to the Gateways, as did curious heterosexuals, and by 1967 Gina made the club women-only. For many women, a visit to the Gateways was the first introduction to lesbian life.

The club was described as having a green door with a steep staircase leading down to a windowless cellar bar that was only 35 ft x 18 ft. The walls had been painted by local artists and there was a constant smoky atmosphere. The layout included a bar that was located at one end of the room, with the toilets and a cloakroom at the other.

During the mid 1960s, many lesbians in the club stopped conducting butch/femme roles. However, the club was still a haven for butch/femme lesbian couples during the era of hardline separatist feminism of the late 1970s and first half of the 1980s. The bar owners worked hard to keep lesbian politics out of the bar and Gina asked them to take their debates elsewhere.

In its heyday in the 1960s, it was popular with artists and celebrities such as Diana Dors and Dusty Springfield. At this point it was entirely run by Ted Ware's wife, Gina, with the help of Smithy. Maggi Hambling described the club as being 'All sweat and sway of so many people dancing in a small space, that was part of the excitement'. It was the exciting atmosphere created by a lot of lusty women that made the club so special, not the surroundings.

During the 1970s, gay and lesbian people became more politically motivated. Members of the Gay Liberation Front protested outside the bar and encouraged women entering the club to 'Come out'. When they entered the club, Gina called the police and GLF members were arrested and charged with obstruction. Feminists did not like the club either, because it was not political enough. Political activists were tolerated at the Gateways as long as they did not mention politics while present.

More gay and lesbian venues opened up in central London during the 1980s and the fashion was for large gay discos. The Gateways became very quiet during weekday evenings and was only busy on Fridays and Saturdays. The neighbourhood around Chelsea went very upmarket and, in 1985, the club lost its late licence due to complaints of loud music.

After opening only three nights a week for a while, the club was eventually closed in 1985. The last event was the Kenric event on Monday 23 September 1985.

== Clubs and groups ==
In 1963 the Minorities Research Group, the first nationwide lesbian group in the United Kingdom, was started. Members were recruited from amongst the Gateways clientele and the group held meetings at the club.

The first Kenric group - now a nationwide organisation for lesbian and bisexual women - also used to meet regularly in the Gateways club on Monday nights, when the bar was otherwise closed.

Jackie Forster reported being able to distribute Sappho magazine and advertise Sappho's events in the Gateways.

== In the media ==
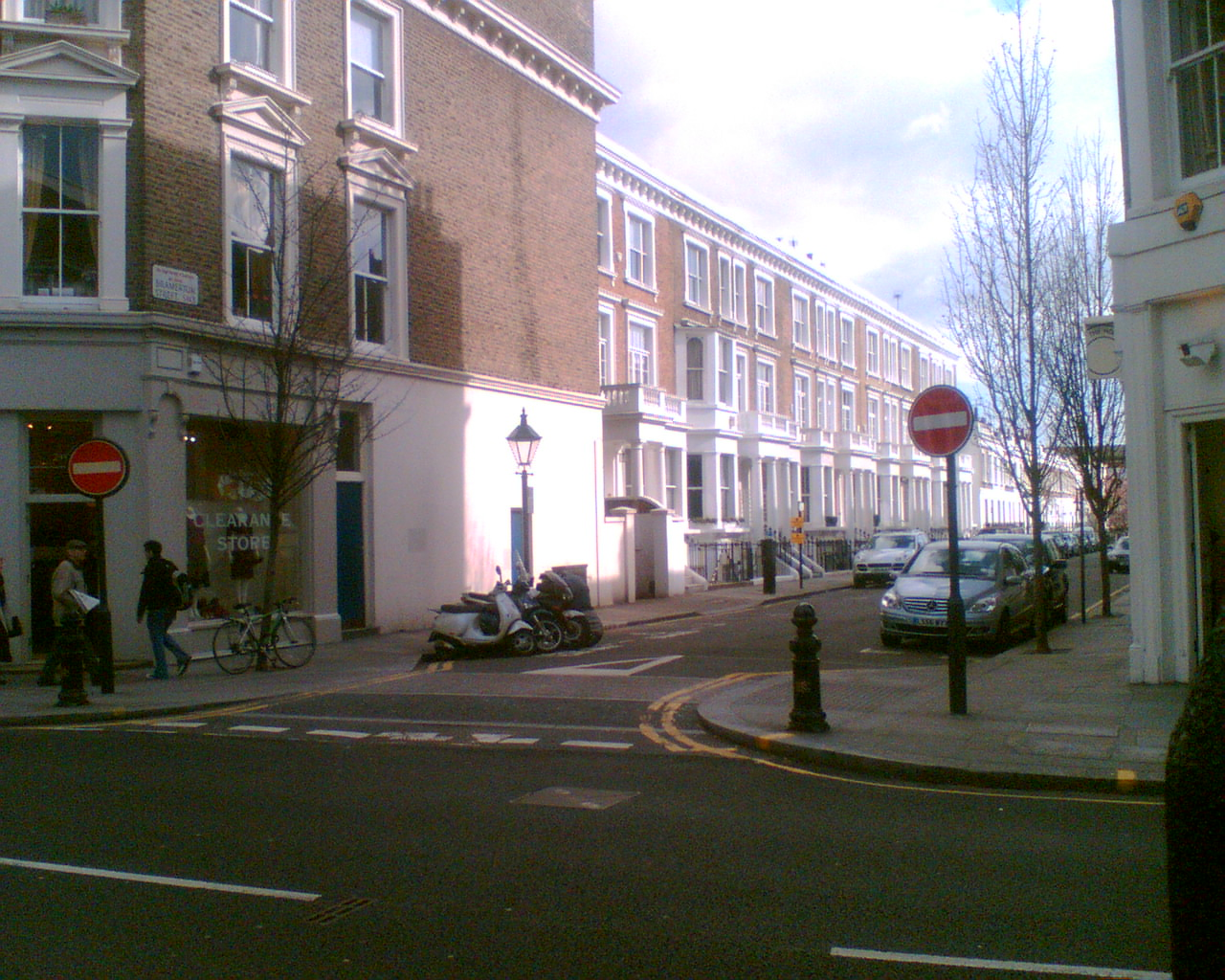
The door to the former Gateways Club (now painted blue) - March 2007

The song "Green Door" is rumoured to be inspired by the club, though this is unlikely.

The life of this large cellar club was central to the best-selling lesbian novel The Microcosm (1966) by Maureen Duffy. The Gateways was also the main focus of Duffy's chapter on 'Lesbian London' in New London Spy, a 1966 guide to alternative London, edited by Hunter Davies.

In 1967, when reform of the law on male homosexual acts was about to be passed by Parliament, the BBC aired two programmes called Man Alive: Consenting Adults. The second programme featured an interview with women at the Gateways club.

The club also appeared as a backdrop (including extended scenes filmed inside the club and featuring regular club-goers) in the 1968 film The Killing of Sister George starring Beryl Reid, Susannah York and Coral Browne, which was one of the earliest mainstream films to feature lesbianism. Filming in the club took place over seven days from the 9–16 June 1968.

Eighty Gateways members, including Maggi Hambling, Maureen Duffy, Pat Arrowsmith, and some who appeared in the film, including Archie and Susannah York, shared their memories and photos in From the Closet to the Screen: Women at the Gateways Club 1945-85, by Jill Gardiner. Reading this book inspired Amy Lamé to put on 'Duckie goes to the Gateways' in London Pride in 2013.

Maureen Chadwick's play The Speed Twins was set in an afterlife version of the Gateways, complete with such features as the juke box, and premiered at Riverside Studios, Hammersmith in 2013.

A version of the Gateways club featured in Call the Midwife Series 5 Episode 7 as a place visited by the character Patsy Mount and her girlfriend Delia Busby, first broadcast on BBC 1 on 28 February 2016.

The club features significantly in the novel 'Time of Obsessions' by John Roman Baker (Wilkinson House, 2017). The main protagonist Greg moves into a flat on Bramerton Street and becomes a regular at the club. There is also a significant lesbian character named Prue.

In June 2022 BBC Four broadcast Gateways Grind: London's Secret Lesbian Club, in which Sandi Toksvig interviewed former clients and those associated with the club.
