= Arena Three =

British monthly magazine, 1964–1971

- February 1966 cover
- Frequency: Monthly
- Publisher: Minorities Research Group
- Founder: Esme Langley, Diana Chapman
- First issue: 1964
- Final issue: 1971
- Country: United Kingdom
- Language: English

Arena Three was a British monthly publication founded by Esme Langley and Diana Chapman in 1964. It was written by and for lesbians and published by the Minorities Research Group (MRG) from 1964 to 1971.

== History ==
Arena Three came out of a need for a lesbian-specific magazine that could encourage MRG membership outside of London. The name was chosen for its neutrality and to not arouse suspicion of the nature of its contents. The first issue of Arena Three was published in the spring of 1964 and quickly grew in readership. By July 1965 it had over 600 members.

Due to concerns with public morality laws, Arena Three was not sold to the general public and instead depended on revenue from private subscriptions. The magazine consequently struggled to find avenues for advertising due to the nature of its content.

From early on, the publication also suffered from larger tensions within the organization. In 1970, Arena Three’s income had become dire, and after a revitalization led in part by Jackie Forster, it once more began to be profitable. By 1971, internal disagreements had hit a breaking point. Esmé Langley decided to end the publication after taking Arena Three’s financial assets abroad. The newer recruits to the magazine reorganized under Foster to create Sappho.

== Contents ==
The magazine featured articles on the causes of lesbianism, lesbian relationships, and general life and wellbeing as a lesbian. It had a public debate forum in the form of reader letters, and published general poetry, short stories and book reviews of interest.

== Membership ==
Arena Three was written and targeted at middle class lesbians in their thirties. MRG membership was open to both men and women regardless of their sexuality, and a number of gay men, social workers, and psychiatrists subscribed.

Class issues within the magazine were documented. A 1964 questionnaire of readers showed that teaching and nursing were predominant occupations, due in part to both profession's discouragement of marriage. By 1971, 40% of their readership identified as a “professional.”

A significant number of readers had also been in relationships with men, with 40% having been married.

Readership has been estimated to be no more than 12,000 readers per month, due in some part to its international subscribers.

== See also ==
- Lesbian feminism
- Lesbian literature
- List of lesbian periodicals
