= Bramerton Street =

Street in Chelsea, London

Coordinates: 51°29′6.18″N 0°10′13.72″W

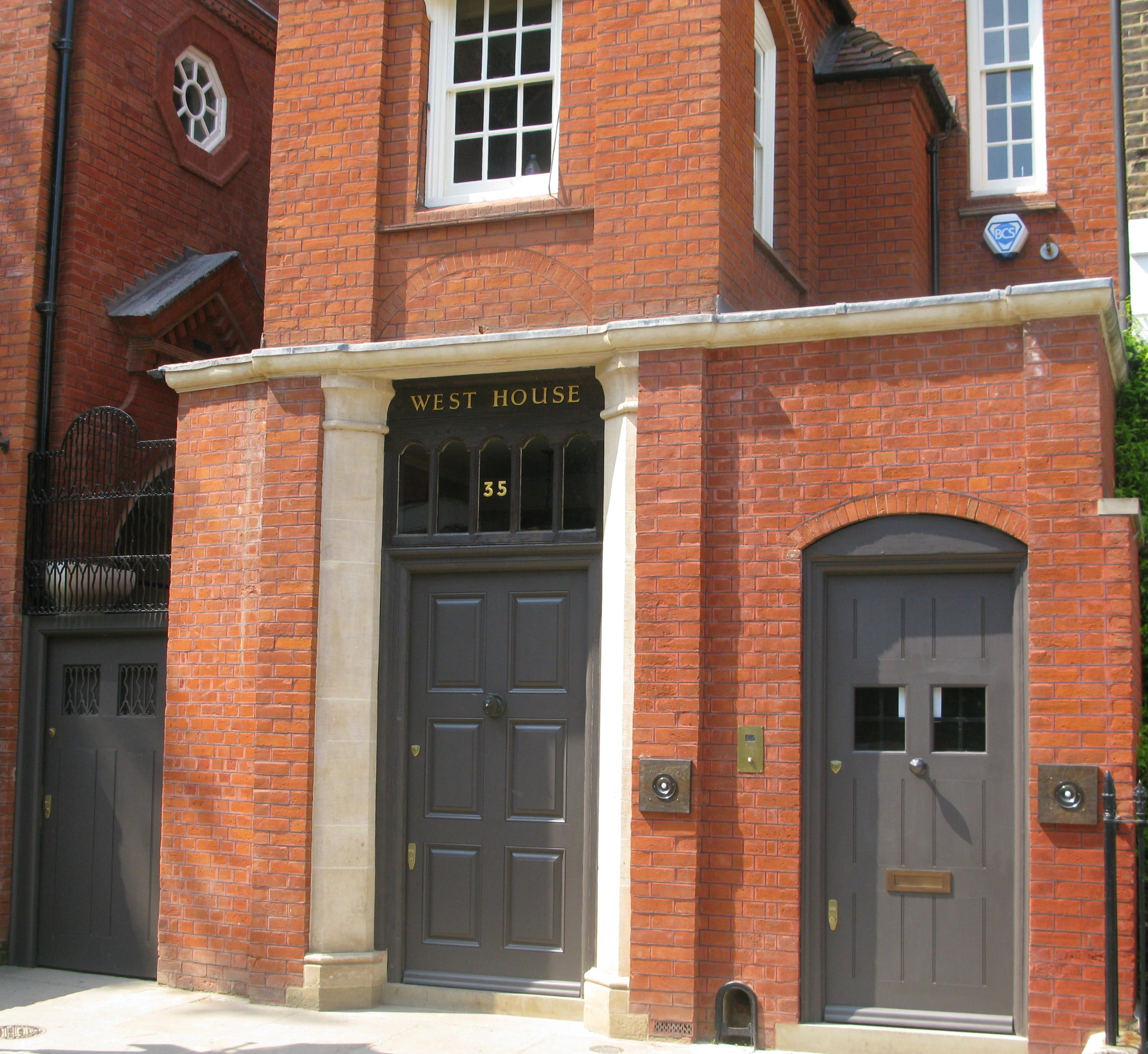
West House, 35 Bramerton Street

Bramerton Street is a street in Chelsea, London. It runs roughly north to south from King's Road to Glebe Place. It was known as Caledonian Terrace until 1912.

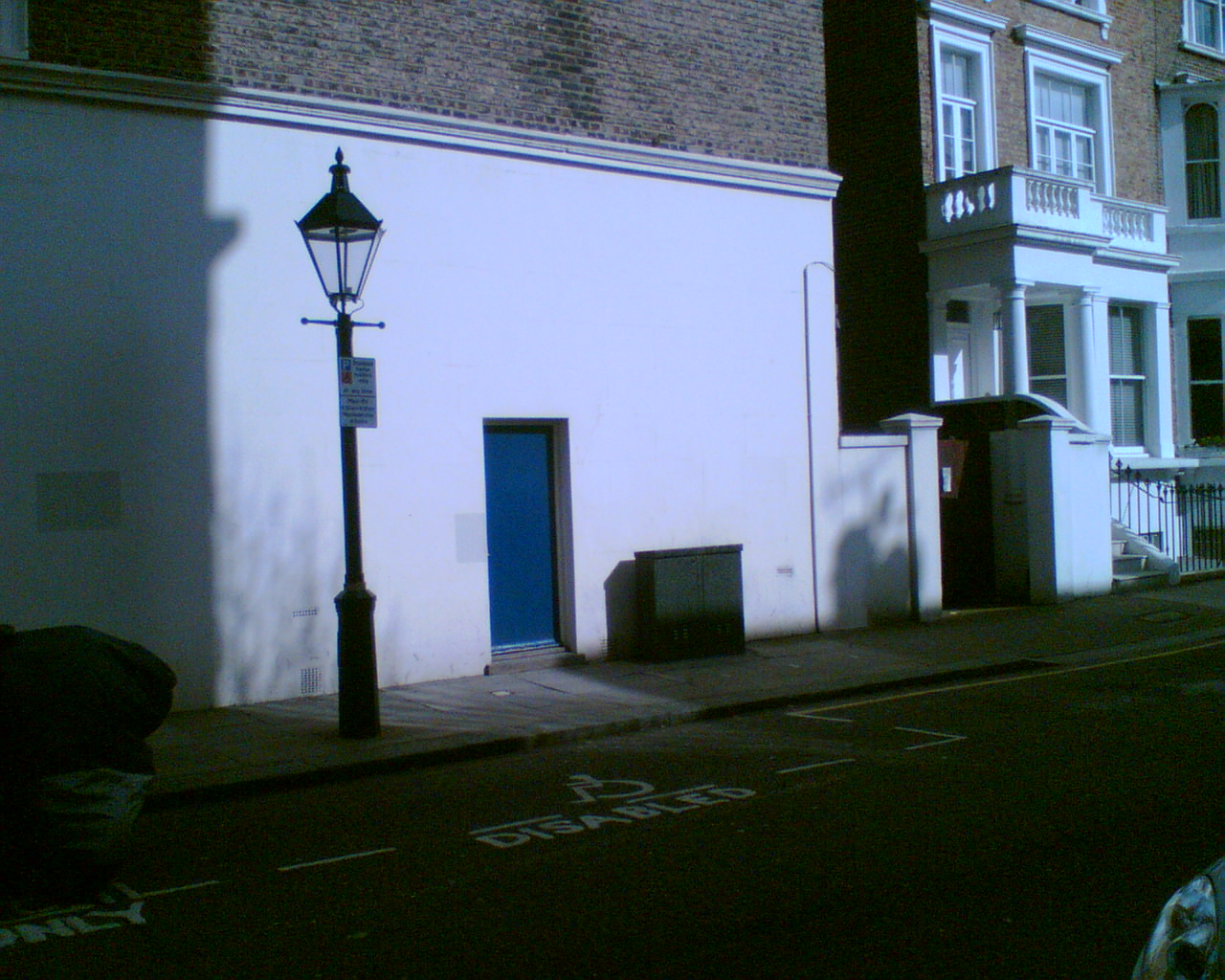
Entrance to the Gateways Club, originally green

The Gateways Club, a lesbian nightclub was based on the corner with King's Road, but with its entrance in Bramerton Street from 1931 to 1985, and was the longest-surviving such club in the world.

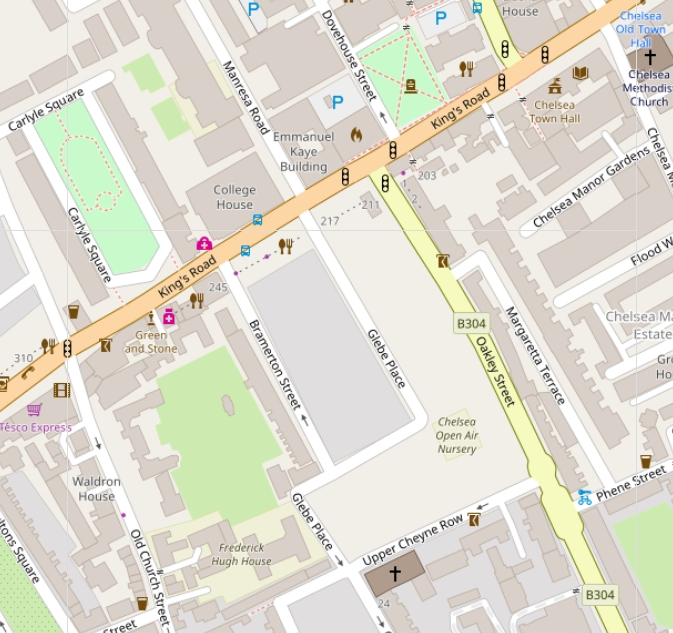
Bramerton Street area map

The socialist politician and writer Margaret Cole and her husband G. D. H. Cole, and the writer Ford Madox Ford was a visitor in 1920.

The film composer James Bernard lived at number 19 Bramerton Street with his partner Paul Dehn.

In the early 1960s, production designer Christopher Hobbs and author John Roman Baker occupied respectively the top floor and basement of number 14. A fictionalised record of life in the street is included in John Roman Baker's book "Time of Obsessions".

The grade II* listed West House is on the west side at the southern end of the street.
