= Butch Is Not a Dirty Word =

Australian magazine

Butch is Not a Dirty Word
- Issue 7 cover
- Editor: Esther Godoy
- Frequency: Biannually
- First issue: March 2017
- Based in: Melbourne, Australia
- Website: www.butchisnotadirtyword.com
- OCLC: 988027677

Butch is Not a Dirty Word (BINADW) is an Australian biannual magazine for butch lesbians and their supporters, the only magazine in the world specifically dedicated to gender nonconforming women. The magazine's motto is "A queer magazine for butch dykes, butch lesbians, butch women, trans butches, non-binary butches & all those who love them."

== History ==
The magazine was founded in Melbourne, Australia, in March 2017 as a not-for-profit project dedicated to butch lesbians and "masculine-of-center" women in Australia and throughout the world. The magazine is edited by pro-skateboarder Esther Godoy and was inspired by the San Francisco photographer Meg Allen's photo series "Butch". Godoy has said her experience of emigrating from Melbourne to Portland, Oregon, helped inspire her to create the magazine, because it was in Portland that she first felt accepted as a butch lesbian. The magazine aims to reclaim the word "butch", provide more positive representation for butch lesbians and masculine-presenting women, and expand the butch lesbian community in Australia.

Godoy has stated that the purpose of Butch Is Not A Dirty Word is about:

breaking up the ideal that masculinity and femininity have to belong to male or female. Female masculinity is just as valid as male masculinity. It’s not really bound to your sex or gender. Yet it’s surprising how much of a taboo it still is, when you look like a guy but you’re a girl.

BINADW aims to combat lesbian invisibility and dispel the lesbophobic and ageist "old butch dyke" trope that associates being butch with "aggression, ugliness, and loneliness." Godoy said this was a common stereotype where she grew up and it was especially painful because this stereotyping and rejection came from inside the queer community. BINADW uses stories and photos to provide positive representation instead. One participant said she appreciated how the project emphasized many types of butch-ness, showing people that there are many ways to be butch.

Among the many issues that BINADW explores is ageism within lesbian communities. The third issue of the magazine was "dedicated to exploring the experiences and perspectives of Butches of all ages" to acknowledge and honor "the road that our Butch Elders have paved for us, and how their contributions have created a safer space for queers to exist and thrive."

By 2025, BINADW had print and online versions and regularly hosted events in Portland.

BINADW contributors include Jewel Robinson, Leah Peterson, and Avery Everhart.

== See also ==
- Lesbian literature
- List of lesbian periodicals
- LGBTQ literature in Australia
