= Minorities Research Group =

The Minorities Research Group (MRG) (est. 1963) was the first organisation to openly advocate the interests of lesbians in the United Kingdom. It was founded by four women who got together in response to an article that was published in the magazine Twentieth Century. The group published the Minorities Research Group Newsletter, and went on to publish its own lesbian magazine called Arena Three that provided a lifeline to remote lesbians around the country.

The aims of the MRG were quoted as to "collaborate in research into the homosexual condition, especially as it concerns women; and to disseminate information to those genuinely in the quest of enlightenment". Esme Langley, one of the group's key founders, was insistent that it should focus on research and be inclusive of heterosexuals and supportive of lesbian individuals. As well as lesbians, its members included social workers, psychiatrists and writers such as Iris Murdoch.

== The beginning ==
MRG was founded by Esme Langley. She was the editor, and working with her on the magazine were Diana Chapman, Cynthia Reid, Julie Switsur and Patricia Dunkley. The group was prompted by the article "A quick look at lesbians" by the journalist Dilys Rowe in late 1962. Although it would appear condemning in the present day, it discussed serious issues with interviews and quotations, and it prompted an interest in research into lesbian (and bisexual) lives. This research concept continued throughout the existence of the Minorities Research Group, which also provided a central point for formerly disparate individuals and information. Ultimately, the MRG provided education, support and opportunities to socialise for lesbians nationwide.

== In the media ==
Many MRG members were also members of the Gateways club in Chelsea, London, which featured in the film The Killing of Sister George. The Arena Three publication and the benefits of MRG membership were regularly promoted inside amongst its clientele and group meetings were sometimes held there.

Other group members were located through small classified advertisements placed in British newspapers such as The Daily Telegraph. At first, many newspapers thought that their content was too offensive and refused to publish their adverts. The first to accept their adverts was The Sunday Times in May 1964 after it ran an article on the MRG.

A further two articles were published in The Guardian and the News of the World later that year. This prompted a rush of enquiries and boosted membership from all over the country. Many of the members were married and had to get their husbands' written consent before they could join.

In 1964, Esme Langley was interviewed by a psychiatrist for a late night Welsh television program. Shortly afterwards a documentary was made for This Week, the first national British television program on lesbians. This was broadcast on 7 January 1965, which featured several MRG members.

Initially, the group had quite an impact on the press and on television which elevated the status of lesbians into something that could be discussed in ordinary society. Many women, including Esme Langley, volunteered to be interviewed and photographed for this purpose, risking loss of employment, abuse and loss of family connections.

In 1971 a third television program about lesbians was made by Brigid Segrave called The important thing is love. This program also featured eight women from the MRG and was considered important as it was the first time that the women faced the camera without their identities being hidden.

== Group politics ==
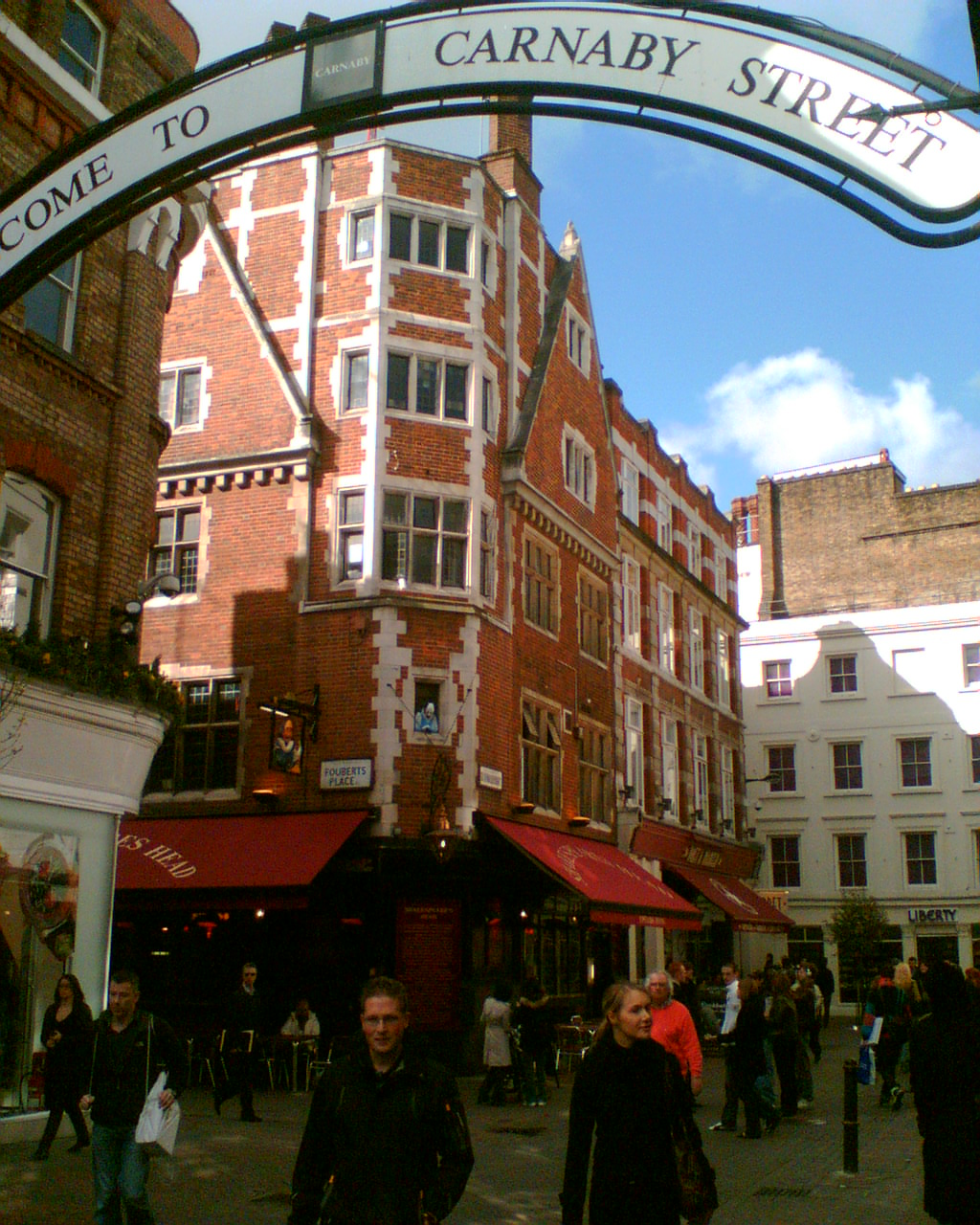
The Shakespeare's Head on Carnaby Street – March 2007

At one of the group debates in August 1964, a record 70 women turned up to discuss 'the freedom of dress'. This took place in a room above the Shakespeare's Head in Carnaby Street. Many of the women had been objecting to some women wearing the 'butch' attire of a suit and tie to meetings. This eventually led to long-term social divisions within the group where butch women became excluded.

The Shakespeare's Head also had another function as the home of the MRG lending library and reading group. Much of the lesbian literature of the time was not available through book stores and public libraries, so the MRG library was an invaluable resource of largely donated books and publications. This library was eventually passed to lesbian social network Kenric in 1966.

The Minorities Research group had an active relationship with the American equivalent of the time period, Daughters of Bilitis.

Some of the MRG members wanted to steer away from research to improve the social aspects of the group. They went on to found the still running Kenric in 1965.

== Arena Three ==
The Minorities Research Group was responsible for producing the monthly journal Arena Three, which was Britain's first lesbian and bisexual women's publication. This publication was produced from 1963 to 1972 and at its peak, it was distributed by mail order to approximately 500-600 subscribers. Arena Three was not available in the shops and was entirely funded by Esme Langley, some advertising and its subscribers.

Arena Three was largely written by the same group of women and was often accused of being too middle class. It graduated from a type-written newsletter to a full glossy magazine by 1971. Maureen Duffy and Jackie Forster became regular contributors. A recent review of the magazine by Brighton Ourstory describes its contents as including letters from women around the country discussing local dances, events and the gay and lesbian politics of the day.

== Esme Langley ==
Esme Langley (1919–1992) was the founder, secretary and driving force of the Minorities Research Group. She was responsible for editing and producing the Mainland and Arena Three magazines. She also appeared in several early documentaries about lesbians, including The important thing is love, released in 1971.

Esme worked as a secretary and was working in the field of magazine publishing at the time when she started MRG. She raised her eldest son on her own without ever being married, which was an unusual thing to do at the time. In 1958 she wrote a semi-autobiographical book called Why Should I be Dismayed under the pseudonym of Ann Bruce, which describes her life from being in the A.T.S in occupied Germany to being a single parent and living in the conservative post Second World War era.

== The end ==
After the legalisation of male homosexuality in the UK with the implementation of the Sexual Offences Act 1967 other more political organisations had appeared, such as the Campaign for Homosexual Equality which focuses on equal rights for all homosexuals. These superseded the objectives of Minorities Research Group and helped bring about its demise and evolution.

The MRG ended with the final issue of Arena Three, which was published in March 1972. Former group member Jackie Forster went on to start Sappho magazine and organisation in the same year. Jackie also went on to become an Executive member of the Campaign for Homosexual Equality and the Gay Liberation Front along with other former MRG members such as Maureen Duffy.

== Notable members ==
- Jackie Forster was a broadcaster, an active member and wrote for Arena Three.
- Maureen Duffy wrote for Arena Three and wrote The Microcosm.
- Barbara Bell was the South Coast representative for MRG, as described in her biography Just Take Your Frock Off.

== Reference articles ==
In summary, the article "A Quick Look at Lesbians by Dilys Rowe" (Winter 1962–1963) was based on an interview with three self-confessed "homosexual women" and a female doctor who specialised in marriage guidance. The article focused on the largely invisible lives of lesbians in society at the time and their relationships with their mother and father. It proposed that lesbians reported growing up in families where they had a weak father and a dominant mother and that they had failed to emotionally bond with their fathers during their formative years.

Following on from this, a research article that was compiled with the help of the Minorities Research Group was "On the Genesis of Female Homosexuality by E. Bene" for the British Journal of Psychiatry, September 1965, pp. 815–21. This included further research into the parental relationship by sampling 37 lesbians from the group and 80 married women. The results also pointed towards lesbians having a poor relationship with their fathers.

== See also ==
- LGBT rights in the United Kingdom
- List of LGBT rights organisations
