= Jackie Forster =

English reporter and lesbian rights activist (1926–1998)

- Forster, c. 1950s
- Born: Jacqueline Moir MacKenzie; 6 November 1926; London, England
- Died: 10 October 1998 (aged 71); London, England
- Occupations: News reporter, actress, lesbian rights activist
- Spouse: Peter Forster (1958–1962)

Jackie Forster (née Jacqueline Moir Mackenzie; 6 November 1926 – 10 October 1998) was an English news reporter, actress and lesbian rights activist.

== Early life ==
Forster's father was a colonel in the Royal Army Medical Corps and she spent her early years in British India. When she was six, she was sent to boarding school in Britain at Wycombe Abbey and then to St Leonards School in Fife. During the Second World War, she played lacrosse and field hockey for Scotland.

Forster became an actress and joined the Wilson Barrett repertory company in Edinburgh, before moving to London in 1950. She attended the Arts Theatre Club, as well as being was in various West End productions and films, before developing a successful career as a TV presenter and news reporter under the name of Jacqueline MacKenzie. For her coverage of Grace Kelly and Prince Rainier's wedding, Forster won the Prix d'Italia award in 1956.

In 1957, she was on a lecture tour in North America for part of the year, and was in Savannah, Georgia, when she had her first lesbian affair. Despite this, she married author Peter Forster in 1958, but the marriage was over within two years, as she accepted her true sexual orientation. They divorced in 1962 and she went to live in Canada.

Of her early lesbian experiences, she said "I didn't see myself as being a lesbian, or her, because I didn't look as I imagined they did, and nor did she. We weren't short back and sides and natty gent's suiting. I got the image from The Well of Loneliness, like we all did. There were drug stores around the States, with these pulp books, lurid stories about lesbians who smoked cigars and had orgies with young girls. I thought, where are these women? We never met anyone we knew were lesbians. There were no other books that I found about lesbians, no films that we ever saw: nothing at all."

In 1964, Forster returned to Britain to work for Border Television, and eventually moved in with a girlfriend and her children in London.

== Activism and legacy ==
In the 1960s, Forster joined the Minorities Research Group and wrote for its journal Arena Three. She would also regularly promote the magazine in the Gateways club.

Later on, she came out publicly in 1969 when she joined the Campaign for Homosexual Equality (CHE), and went to serve on its executive committee. She was in the first Gay Pride march in the UK in August 1971.

In 1972, Forster was one of the founders of Sappho, which was a social group and one of the UK's longest-running lesbian publications (Sappho magazine was published from 1972 to 1981, although the group continued to meet regularly for many more years). The Sappho group members used to meet in the Chepstow pub in Notting Hill, and had speakers such as Maureen Duffy and Anna Raeburn.

After Sappho, Forster became a member of the Greater London Council's Women's Committee.

From 1992 until her death in 1998, Forster was an active member of the Lesbian Archive and Information Centre management Committee (now part of the Glasgow Women's Library). In 1997, a BBC film crew came to the archive to film her for a programme about her life, which was to be part of The Day That Changed My Life series. Her work has made a huge impact on shaping the archive.

On 6 November 2017, Google Doodle commemorated her 91st birthday. On 26 February 2025, a rainbow plaque was unveiled at her former London home in Warwick Avenue.

== Television and film appearances ==
- Caesar's Wife, 1951, television acting role.
- You're Only Young Twice, 1952, film acting role as Nellie.
- Love and Mr Lewisham, 1953, television acting role.
- The Wedding of Lili Marlene, 1953, film acting role as Theatre Barmaid.
- Serious Charge, 1953, repertory theatre acting role.
- The Broken Jug, 1953, television acting role as Grete.
- Gilbert Harding Finds Out, 1954, as straight-to-camera television reporter.
- Lilacs in the Spring, 1954, film acting role.
- The Dam Busters, 1955, film acting role as Canteen Waitress.
- You Can't Escape, 1955, television acting role as Mrs Baggerley.
- Grace Kelly's Monaco wedding to Prince Rainier, 1956, as straight-to-camera television reporter. Won a Prix D'Italia.
- Pantomania or Dick Wittington, 1956, television comedy acting role.
- Tonight, as straight-to-camera television reporter.
- Hotfoot and Highlight, as straight-to-camera television reporter.
- Panorama, as straight-to-camera television reporter.
- Late Night Extra, as straight-to-camera television reporter.
- Trouble for Two, 1958, television acting role in a sitcom.
- Discovering America, 1958–1960, as straight-to-camera television reporter.
- Jacqueline Mackenzie in America, as straight-to-camera television reporter.
- Speak for Yourself, 1974 as television co-scriptwriter.
- Gays: Speaking Up, 1978 as interviewee.
- We Recruit, 1995, appearance in a Channel 4 television documentary about the Lesbian Avengers.
- From High Heels to Sensible Shoes, 1997, contributor to the BBC television series The Day That Changed My Life.

== See also ==
- LGBT rights in the United Kingdom
