= Kenric =

- Founded: 1965
- Founders: Cynthia Reid, Julie Switsur
- Type: Social network
- Legal status: Active
- Purpose: Social activities and support for lesbians
- Region served: United Kingdom

Kenric was established in 1965 and is made up of a network of social groups for lesbians throughout the United Kingdom. Members are of all ages, although mainly due to the long-running nature of the network it is most popular with women over 30 years old. It is often the only lesbian social outlet in areas where there is not much visible gay and lesbian presence.

== Members ==
Throughout the country the local groups are managed by a network volunteers, who organise discos, club nights, walks, reading groups, golf tournaments, discussion groups and other such events to suit the locality. These women are from all walks of life, professions, ages and social backgrounds.

Members of the network keep in touch via a national monthly magazine, as well as regional newsletters. The basic philosophy is that no lesbian should feel isolated or alone, no matter where they are. The group now has over 1200 subscribers, located all over the country and overseas.

== Major events ==
Each year the organisation hosts major event that include a Christmas ball in London and an event in Eastbourne to mark the end of the International Women's Open tennis tournament. These events are open to women who are both members and non-members.

== History ==
The name "Kenric" was formed from joining the regional names of Kensington and Richmond, which is where the group was originally formed in 1965, by Cynthia Reid and Julie Switsur. It sprung from the nucleus of the old Surrey and south-west London section of the Minorities Research Group. A former member believes that a group calling themselves The Sisters of Kranzchen may have been forerunners of Kenric. Many of the early members of Kenric were members of the Gateways club in Chelsea. Some of the early members were also members of the Minorities Research Group (which published the magazine Arena Three), but were keen to move away from research into lesbianism and develop the more social aspects. Kenric aimed to alleviate isolation and forge a material community through the organisation of social meetings and parties. It was established as a purely social group with no campaigning remit or political affiliations though charitable work for other gay organisations was to be occasionally undertaken. In November 1965 a management committee was formed by the first five memberswhich set about drafting the application form, establishing the British Monomark address for receipt of correspondence and drawing up the Kenric constitution. Sheila Kent typed the first newsletter, Doreen Holley was put forward as “Chair”, followed by Hilary Nathan in 1966, and Vivienne Gillings in 1967.

== Newsletter ==
Kenric soon started to connect members via a newsletter.

== See also ==
- List of LGBT organizations
