= London Property Letter =

The London Property Letter (LPL), founded and published by Sylvester Stein and Bob Troop, was one of the first newsletters in the UK. The magazine was part of Stonehart Publications. It was a mail-order magazine sold on subscription to anyone looking to invest in property in the London area. It highlighted up-and-coming areas and advised on purchase and rental strategies. The magazine was published on a monthly basis. Later it was renamed as London Property. It folded in 2019.
