= WD J1330+6435 =

White dwarf star in the constellation Draco

- Visible spectrum of WD J1330+6435 (left) and its simulated surface colour (right); Credit: Mark A. Hollands et al.

Observation data Epoch J2000 Equinox ICRS
- Constellation: Draco
- Right ascension: 13^{h} 30^{m} 01.16366^{s}
- Declination: +64° 35′ 23.7116″

Characteristics
- Spectral type: DZ
- Apparent magnitude (G): 20.645±0.010

Astrometry
Proper motion (μ)	RA: −110.630±1.514 mas/yr Dec.: −23.300±1.376 mas/yr
Parallax (π)	11.5812±0.7812 mas
Distance	280 ± 20 ly (86 ± 6 pc)

Details
Mass	0.74±0.10 M_{☉}
Surface gravity (log g)	8.26±0.15 cgs
Temperature	4310±190 K
Age	9.1+1.1 −0.5 Gyr

Other designations
- WD J133001.17+643523.69, SDSS J133001.17+643523.69

Database references
SIMBAD	data

WD J1330+6435, also known as SDSS J1330+6435, is a white dwarf located 281.6 light-years (86.35 parsecs) from the Solar System in the constellation Draco, slightly northeast of Thuban and nearly directly south of Kappa Draconis. It appears green in colour due to strong absorption by sodium and calcium in its atmosphere, making it a rare example of a green star. It is the first star found with this hue.

== Nomenclature ==
The name WD J1330+6435, shortened from WD J133001.17+643523.69, indicates that it is a white dwarf located at a right ascension of 13^{h} 30^{m} and a declination of +64° 35′. It is sometimes referred to by its Sloan Digital Sky Survey designation as SDSS J133001.17+643523.69 or SDSS J133001.13+643523.7, both shortened to SDSS J1330+6435.

The star was first documented in 1999 in the McCook-Sion White Dwarf Catalog where it is listed as WD 1328+648, indicating the star's position at epoch B1950.0.

== Properties ==
WD J1330+6435 is a white dwarf, radiating away its remaining heat and cooling over time rather than generating energy through nuclear fusion. This star's effective temperature is relatively low, at only around 4300 K. Its atmosphere is nearly pure helium, with hydrogen making up less than 1 in 10,000 of all atoms.

WD J1330+6435 has a spectral type of DZ, indicating that it is a white dwarf whose spectrum shows metal absorption lines. It displays strong sodium, calcium, and lithium absorption lines. The star's cool, dense atmosphere results in extreme broadening of these metal absorption lines, allowing them to significantly alter the star's colour. Due to strong sodium absorption at orange wavelengths and calcium absorption at violet wavelengths, WD J1330+6435 appears green in colour.

The presence of these elements in the star's atmosphere requires accretion of materials from the surrounding planetary system. The nature of the infalling material is not known with certainty, and could either be primitive planetesimals or pieces of differentiated bodies.

According to Mark Hollands of the University of Warwick, lead author of a 2026 study that established the star's greenish tone, the star's density is so high that the sodium atoms are continually being bombarded by neighboring helium atoms, changing the sodium atomic energy levels. "The end result is that the sodium atoms no longer absorb one very narrow wavelength of orange—they absorb the yellows, oranges and some of the red wavelengths. And what you're left with is a star that has a beautiful chartreuse green glow, something that wouldn't be possible for sun-like stars," Hollands said.
