= The Killing of Sister George (film) =

1968 film by Robert Aldrich

- Original film poster
- Directed by: Robert Aldrich
- Written by: Lukas Heller
- Based on: The Killing of Sister George by Frank Marcus
- Produced by: Robert Aldrich
- Starring: Beryl Reid; Susannah York; Coral Browne; Ronald Fraser; Patricia Medina; Hugh Paddick; Cyril Delevanti
- Cinematography: Joseph F. Biroc
- Edited by: Michael Luciano
- Music by: Gerald Fried
- Production companies: Palomar Pictures; The Associates and Aldrich
- Distributed by: Cinerama Releasing Corporation
- Release date: 12 December 1968
- Running time: 138 minutes
- Countries: United States; United Kingdom
- Language: English
- Budget: $2,550,000
- Box office: $5,325,000

The Killing of Sister George is a 1968 film directed by Robert Aldrich and filmed at his Aldrich Studios in Los Angeles. It is based on the 1964 play by British playwright Frank Marcus. In the film, an ageing lesbian television actress, June "George" Buckridge (Beryl Reid, reprising her role from the stage play), simultaneously faces the loss of her popular television role and the breakdown of her long-term relationship with a younger woman (Susannah York). Although Marcus's play was a black comedy, the film version was marketed as a "shocking drama"; it added explicit lesbian content that was not in the original play, and was presented as a serious treatment of lesbianism.

Along with the more campy films What Ever Happened to Baby Jane? and Hush...Hush, Sweet Charlotte, The Killing of Sister George cemented Robert Aldrich's status as a director with queer audiences.

== Plot ==
Middle-aged actress June Buckridge plays "Sister George", a lovable motor scooter-riding district nurse and local sage, in a fictional long-running BBC television soap opera, Applehurst. She has been with the show for four years and is so identified with her character that she is nicknamed "George".

Off-screen, June is outspoken, ribald, cigar-smoking and frequently inebriated, unlike her kindly on-screen persona. Although June has been popular with viewers in the past, several Applehurst characters have recently been killed off, causing June to worry that Sister George may be next. Her worry affects her already volatile relationship with her live-in lover, a younger woman named Alice, whom June calls "Childie".

Childlike Alice plays with dolls, writes poetry, and has a minor fashion industry job, but relies on June for most of her financial and emotional support. Domineering June is alternately affectionate toward Alice and abusive to her, and reacts jealously when Alice spends time with other women or men. Alice rebels by talking back to June and refusing to play along with a "contrition" game in which June makes her kneel and eat a cigar butt.

After an Applehurst colleague jokes about Sister George possibly dying on the show, June walks out on a script reading, gets drunk, and forces herself into a taxi alongside two young Catholic nuns, whom she sexually assaults, resulting in the taxi having an accident in a busy intersection. The nuns' Mother Superior and the Archbishop complain to the BBC, causing powerful network producer Mrs Croft to visit June at home and lecture her about her behaviour and her attitude at work. When June balks at apologising for the incident, Mrs Croft makes clear that her future at the network depends on her apologising and changing her ways. Mrs Croft further infuriates June by taking an interest in Alice, complimenting her cooking and encouraging her poetic aspirations. At the next script reading, June finds that Sister George has been temporarily written out of the show with an illness, seemingly as punishment for June, and raising the possibility that her character will not recover.

June's spirits improve when she receives the next script, showing that Sister George has recovered and returned to riding her scooter. June and Alice go to a party at Gateways lesbian nightclub, to which she jokingly invites Mrs Croft. Halfway through the party, when June is already annoyed by Alice dancing with another woman, Mrs Croft arrives to tell June in person that Sister George will die by being hit by a ten-ton truck. After June storms off, Mrs Croft invites Alice to meet with her to further discuss Alice's poetry. On June's last day of filming for Applehurst, Alice untruthfully says she cannot meet June for lunch because she is busy at work. June, upset, tries to sabotage her fellow actors' performances and to drag out the filming as long as possible; afterward, she finds out that Alice lied to her in order to meet with Mrs Croft.

At her farewell cast party, June makes a scene, insulting the senior network executive, pouring drinks over a fellow cast member, and finally exploding in front of the guests when Mrs Croft offers her a new role as the voice of a talking cow on a children's puppet show. She confronts Mrs Croft and Alice, who leave the party together and return to June and Alice's flat. Mrs Croft persuades Alice to leave and stay with her for one night in order to avoid June's wrath, and offers to help Alice further her writing ambitions. Alice and Mrs Croft end up having sex in Alice's bedroom, and June catches them in the act; this leads to a final confrontation in which June reveals that Alice is thirty-two years old and the mother of a teenage daughter, whom she abandoned. Alice leaves with Mrs Croft, dropping her key in the letter box to show she will not return. Left alone, June wanders onto the deserted Applehurst set, destroying equipment and props and uttering "moo" like a cow.

== Cast ==
- Beryl Reid as June "George" Buckridge
- Susannah York as Alice "Childie" McNaught
- Coral Browne as Mercy Croft
- Ronald Fraser as Leo Lockhart
- Patricia Medina as Betty Thaxter
- Byron Webster as Jack Adams
- Cyril Delevanti as Ted Baker
- Brendan Dillon as Bert Turner
- Hugh Paddick as Freddie
- Sivi Aberg as Diana
- Rosalie Williams as Mildred
- Elaine Church as Marlene
- Mike Freeman as Noel
- Meier Tzelniker as Mr. Emmanuel Katz
- Cicely Walper as Mrs. Margaret Coote
- William Beckley as Floor Manager
- Maggie Paige as Maid
- Jack Raine as Deputy Commissioner
- Dolly Taylor as Tea Lady
- Sam Kydd as Cab Driver

== Adaptation and production ==
Robert Aldrich bought the screen rights to the play in April 1967.

Lukas Heller wrote the screenplay for the 1968 feature film based on the 1964 play of the same name by Frank Marcus. Although Bette Davis and Angela Lansbury were both offered the role of June "George" Buckridge, the filmmakers ultimately cast Beryl Reid, who had played the part in the original cast production.

Aldrich says he met with Davis. "We were supposed to be discussing the part but what I was really trying to decide if we could work together again," he said. "The outcome was doubtful." Finance came from ABC.

In the movie, Applehurst was changed from a radio programme to a television soap opera, and the lesbian themes of the story were made more explicit, most notably by adding the sex scene between Alice and Mrs. Croft that is not in the stage play. In a televised documentary broadcast at Christmas 1990 on UK Channel 4, entitled Caviar To the General, Coral Browne described filming the scene and her apprehension at doing so, but trusted Aldrich who explained she would never be undressed for the scene. Browne revealed that Susannah York was deeply upset about the scene and was eating grapes in between takes to stop herself from being physically sick. In the end, Aldrich decided to film both actors separately "making love to the camera" rather than each other.

A number of scenes were filmed on location in London. The opening sequence shows June drinking at The Holly Bush public house, before wandering through the streets and alleyways of Hampstead west of Heath Street, and emerging at Hammersmith Bridge. The nightclub party sequence was filmed at the Gateways Club, a real-life lesbian nightclub then located in Chelsea. The Killing of Sister George was the first film to portray the interior of a lesbian nightclub. The exterior scenes outside June's and her neighbour's flats were filmed in Knightsbridge.

== Release ==
Between the time The Killing of Sister George started filming and ended production, the United States movie industry instituted the new MPAA film rating system. Largely on the basis of the graphic sex scene between Alice and Mrs. Croft, The Killing of Sister George received an X rating, which limited its screening in US cinemas and ability to be advertised in mainstream newspapers. Aldrich spent $75,000 battling the rating, but his lawsuit was dismissed, and the film died at the box office.

In the UK, the film also had considerable censorship problems, with BBFC chief John Trevelyan demanding some dialogue changes and the complete removal of the sex scene; this led to a standoff between Aldrich and the BBFC. The Greater London Council and 11 other councils allowed the film to be shown with lesser cuts to the scene, and Trevelyan finally passed a cut version for countrywide release in 1970. All subsequent home releases of the film have been fully uncut.

The Committee for the Theatrical Review of the Italian Ministry of Cultural Heritage and Activities also rated the film as VM18, not suitable for children under 18, in addition to mandating the removal of two scenes involving a kiss between women, and one scene where Mrs. Croft caresses Alice's breast.

Since its theatrical release, the film has been shown a number of times on British television, although sometimes with the sex scene deleted. Rarely seen on American television, it was broadcast uncut by Turner Classic Movies as part of a June 2007 salute to gay cinema.

== Reception ==
=== Box office ===
The movie earned rentals of $3.45 million in North America and $1.875 million in other countries. However, because of its high cost, it recorded an overall loss of $750,000. In France it had admissions of 46,638.

The week of June 4, 1969, the movie was the #1 box office grosser in the United States, making $628,500. It was the first X-rated movie to place number one at the weekly box office in the United States. (Subsequent X-rated movies to hit #1 at the box office: Midnight Cowboy during its tenth week of release on August 6, 1969, and Beyond the Valley of the Dolls on July 22, 1970, in its fifth week on the chart.)

=== Critical response ===
Initial critical response was generally unfavorable. Renata Adler of The New York Times was critical of the film, not just for displaying lesbians, but also for actress performances and the camera work. Later reviews of the film have been much more favorable and on Rotten Tomatoes it holds an approval rating of 63% based on 16 reviews." In an online review for Filmfanatic.org, it said that the best aspect of the film was the relationship between George and Alice and that York's performance is "raw and daring". It went on to say that "This controversial movie may not be for all tastes, but I believe it's must-see viewing for film fanatics."

Derek Winnert commented that "Aldrich has been accused of coarsening and commercialising a subtle play. But, nevertheless, it is a spirited, highly entertaining, even sometimes enlightening, possibly even liberating movie, pulling lesbians out of the closet." He praised the performances of the leading actresses, in which he stated "Reid's marvellous performance is at the heart of Aldrich's version of Frank Marcus's theatre hit. George is a great character, a gin-swigging, cigar-chomping, sadistic masculine woman, the opposite of the sweet character she plays on radio. Reid brings her to vivid life, both pathetic and sympathetic." Of York and Browne, he mentioned they were almost equally fine in their roles.

=== Award nominations ===
Beryl Reid was nominated for the Golden Globe Award for Best Motion Picture Actress in a Drama.

== Home media ==
The Killing of Sister George was released to Region 1 DVD by Anchor Bay Entertainment on 22 February 2000, while distribution rights were later acquired by MGM Home Entertainment, who released the film on 23 August 2005.

The film was made available on Region 2 DVD in the United Kingdom on 8 April 2002 via Prism Leisure Corporation. A reissued DVD was released from Fremantle Home Entertainment on 1 January 2008.

On 27 August 2018, it was announced that Kino Lorber would be releasing The Killing of Sister George on Blu-ray in the United States and Canada. The set contains a new 4K remaster, DTS-HD Master Audio 2.0 and optional English SDH subtitles. Special features include audio commentaries, interviews and theatrical trailer. It was released on 27 November 2018.

== See also ==
- List of American films of 1968
- List of lesbian, gay, bisexual, or transgender-related films by storyline
- Grace Archer
- "The Bowmans"
