= Sappho (organisation) =

English lesbian social club

- Formation: 1972
- Type: Social club
- Purpose: Lesbian activism, discussion, socialisation and legal aid
- Location: London
- Region served: London
- Official language: English
- Key people: Jackie Forster

Sappho was an English lesbian social club founded in 1972 by Jackie Forster and others.

The club, whose namesake was the poet Sappho of Lesbos, met every Tuesday at The Chepstow, a public house in the Notting Hill district of London. The group advertised their meetings in the magazines Time Out London and City Limits.

Until 1981, the club published an eponymous monthly magazine with a peak circulation of about 1,000 copies. The first volume, which cost 20p to purchase, stated that it was a magazine "published and written by homosexual women for homosexual women" with the aims of '[dispersing] the isolation of gay ghettos" and "support all minority groups [...] who work to counteract oppression" among others.

Forster founded and edited the magazine after writing for Arena Three (of the Minorities Research Group), which had folded soon before. Sappho distributed their magazine at their meetings, and also at such lesbian venues as Gateways, a nightclub in Chelsea. Back issues of the magazine are now held in the Hall–Carpenter Archives.

Sappho continued to meet regularly until the late 1990s, each week inviting guest speakers such as Miriam Margolyes, Maureen Duffy, and Anna Raeburn.
