= Lesbians on the Loose =

Lesbian magazine published in Australia (1990-2021)

Lesbians on the Loose - LOTL
- LOTL, April 1997 cover featuring Ellen DeGeneres
- Former editors: Frances Rand (1990–1998); Barbara Farrelly (1994–1998); Merryn Johns (1998 - 2019)
- Categories: Lifestyle magazine
- Frequency: Monthly, Quarterly
- Circulation: 20,000
- Publisher: Silke Bader
- Founder: Frances Rand and Jackie Scherer
- Founded: January 1990
- Company: Iris Media and Events
- Country: Australia
- Based in: Sydney
- Language: English
- Website: www.lotl.com
- ISSN: 1324-6542

Lesbians on the Loose (LOTL) was a lesbian magazine published in Australia. It first appeared in Sydney in January 1990. It covered news, politics, social issues, and included celebrity interviews and stories on entertainment, pop culture, style and travel.

== History and profile ==
Lesbians on the Loose was first published by Frances Rand and Jackie Scherer with an initial run of 1000 copies.

Originally a monthly publication, it set out to keep lesbians informed about activities and events within the community. Scherer left soon after issue one with Rand continuing as publisher until she was joined by Barbara Farrelly in 1994. The magazine grew rapidly reaching a circulation of 20,000 copies by the end of the decade, making it the most read lesbian magazine in Australia.

Rand and Farrelly sold the magazine to Silke Bader in 1998, and Bader continued to be the publisher until at least 2019.

In 2010, Silke Bader bought Curve magazine, a US lesbian magazine. The back office of Lesbians on the Loose was merged with Curve magazine, and publishing continued under two separate titles. The magazines usually shared the cover story but published country-related topics in the relevant title.

In 2019 the magazines were separated again and the publisher sold Curve magazine (2020) to its original US owner. LOTL was relaunched and published five more issues in 2021 before it stopped print production. At the end of 2021, LOTL launched its video podcast Queer Conversation.

== Digitisation ==
The first nine years have been digitised on the National Library of Australia's archive, Trove.

There is also a complete digital archive available on lotl.com/archive.

== In the media ==
Episode 3 of ABC Television and the International Emmy nominated documentary series Kweens of the Queer Underground tells the story of LOTL.

== See also ==
- Lesbian feminism
- List of lesbian periodicals
- List of LGBT periodicals
