= Millennium Research Group =

Millennium Research Group (MRG), is a provider of medical technology market research and competitive intelligence that is located in Toronto, Ontario, Canada and conducts research in over 50 countries worldwide.

The company was founded in 1998 by Bob (Babak) Bahador and Ash (Ashkan) Vahman. The company differentiated itself from its competitors at the time in three key ways: 1- It was one of the earliest providers of data covering global medical markets (not just the US and large European countries) 2- Subscription-based products were emphasized, and clients were quickly migrated to them whenever possible 3- A unique bonus program was implemented for staff (except the owners) to encourage cross-functional teamwork, employee acquisition and retention. It was not uncommon for a receptionist to be awarded a bonus of nearly 100% annually.

The company grew out of its original single-room office at 196 Spadina Avenue in Toronto's Chinatown to occupy 35,000 square feet and 3 floors of space at 175 Bloor Street East within 6 years. Headcount in February 2006 at the time of acquisition was approximately 200 full-time employees in Toronto, in addition to contract-workers in Canada and abroad.

MRG was featured in "Profit Magazine's" listing of the 100 fastest growing companies in Canada for 3 years (2004, 2005, 2006) before it was no longer eligible due to being acquired by a US-based entity.

MRG was internally funded by its earnings and received no venture capital funding.

MRG was acquired by Waltham-based Decision Resource, Inc in 2006.

The company received a Canadian government market research assignment in 2007 that was noted by a USA agency.
