= Raminder Kaur =

Anthropologist

Raminder Kaur is a Professor of Anthropology and Cultural Studies in the Departments of Anthropology and International Development at the University of Sussex. She has conducted fieldwork in India and Britain researching topics such as migration, race/ethnicity/gender, the creative arts, heritage, public culture, aesthetics, censorship, human rights, religion and politics, public representations of, and the socio-political, health and environmental implications of nuclear developments, and 'cultures of sustainability'.

== Life ==
Raminder Kaur gained her BA (Combined Hons) in Social Anthropology and Art and Archaeology, and her PhD in the Department of Anthropology and Sociology at the School of Oriental and African Studies (SOAS). She has held postdoctoral research positions at Brunel University (on an ESRC-funded project 'Reconsidering Ethnicity'), University of East Anglia (as a Getty Research Fellow) and at the University of Manchester (as a Simon-Marks Fellow). She was previously a Lecturer at the University of Manchester.

Raminder served on the Mayor's Commission for Asian and African Heritage (MCAAH) and was a member of the subsequent Heritage Diversity Task Force at the Greater London Authority. She co-authored the MCAAH report, Delivering Shared Heritage, which received the Eurocities Award for Cooperation in Gdańsk, in 2007.

She was a Trustee for Museums, Libraries and Archives London and Honorary Treasurer for the Association for Social Anthropologists (ASA) as well as ASA representative for the World Council of Anthropological Associations (WCAA). She was Chair of the WCAA Ethics Taskforce and a member of the WCAA Advocacy and Outreach Taskforce.

She is Co-Director of the Sussex Asia Centre and formerly Director of Doctoral Studies and interim Director of Equality, Diversity and Inclusion at the Sussex School of Global Studies. She collaborated with others at the School to coordinate a programme of artists, staff and students work for Global Voices at the WOMAD festival in 2015 and 2016

She is a Fellow of the Royal Society of Arts, and the Royal Anthropological Institute where she serves as a member of the RAI Film Committee.

Raminder combines her research interests with creative activities. She was Artistic Director of the theatre group, Chandica Arts, and is currently Chair of the arts organisation, Aldaterra Projects, and Artistic Director of Sohaya Visions.

She has written five authored/co-authored books and five co-edited volumes along with numerous other articles and book chapters.

== Works ==
- Performative Politics and the Cultures of Hinduism: Public Uses of Religion in Western India. London: Anthem Press, 2005.
- (with V. S. Kaira and J, Hutnyk) Diaspora & hybridity. London; Thousand Oaks, CA: Sage Publications, 2005.
- (ed. with A. J. Sinha) Bollyworld : popular Indian cinema through a transnational lens. New Delhi; Thousand Oaks, Calif.: Sage Publications, 2005.
- (ed. with W. Mazzarella) Censorship in South Asia : cultural regulation from sedition to seduction. Bloomington: Indiana University Press, 2009.
- Atomic Mumbai : living with the radiance of a thousand suns. London; New York: Routledge, 2013.
- (ed. with P. Dave-Mukherji) Arts and aesthetics in a globalizing world. London; New York, NY: Bloomsbury Academic, 2014.
- (ed. with C. Alexander and B. St Louis) Mapping changing identities : new directions in uncertain times. London: Routledge, 2014.
- (with S. Eqbal) Adventure comics and youth cultures in India. Milton: Taylor & Francis Group, 2018.
- Kudankulam - The Story of an Indo-Russian Nuclear Power Plant. Oxford University Press, 2020.
