= Green Star Media =

British publishing company

- Company type: Private limited
- Industry: Digital publishing
- Headquarters: Guildford, England, U.K.
- Key people: Andrew Griffiths (Founder and ex-Managing Director); Colin Morrison (Non-Executive Director); Kevin Barrow (General Manager)
- Website: Green Star Media

Green Star Media Ltd is a United Kingdom-based international publisher of specialist sports content through websites, e-magazines and e-books. The company has a subscription-based business model where advertising is not a significant source of revenue. It publishes informed and easy-to-follow advice for coaches in football (soccer), rugby, basketball, for athletes in endurance sports, and sports physiotherapists (physical therapists).

The company was founded by Andrew Griffiths, a former business journalist with The Daily Telegraph and founder of the award-winning AIM Newsletter, which covered London's Alternative Investment Market for smaller companies. Griffiths left the company in November 2018 and remains a significant shareholder.

Trevor Goul-Wheeker was chairman of Green Star Media from January 2013 until May 2015.

Chrysalis VCT invested in the business in June 2014 by providing investment loans. At the same time the company bought two titles, Peak Performance and Sports Injury Bulletin, from Electric Word.

In 2014, the company was shortlisted for a Media Pioneer Award for launching Basketball Coach Weekly into the US market.

== Titles ==
- Rugby Coach Weekly
- Soccer Coach Weekly
- Elite Soccer
- Basketball Coach Weekly
- Peak Performance
- Sports Injury Bulletin
- Women's Soccer Coaching
