= Green star (astronomy) =

Stars that appear green

WD J1330+6435, the first known star with a greenish hue

In astronomy, a green star is a star whose light is perceived as green or greenish, or that appears greenish in some viewing conditions.

Ordinary stars do not appear green under typical viewing conditions because their spectra broadly resemble blackbody radiation, which produces a range of colours that humans generally perceive as orange, white, or blue.

However, a 2026 study found that several white dwarfs may have greenish colours resulting from unusually broad absorption by sodium and calcium in their dense atmospheres.

== Observation ==
=== Blackbody radiation and stellar colour ===
A star's perceived colour depends on the distribution of wavelengths in its light and on the response of human vision. The spectra of most main-sequence stars broadly resemble those of blackbodies, with their colours following the Planckian locus in a chromaticity diagram. Along this locus, stars range broadly from orange at lower temperatures, through white, to pale blue at higher temperatures.

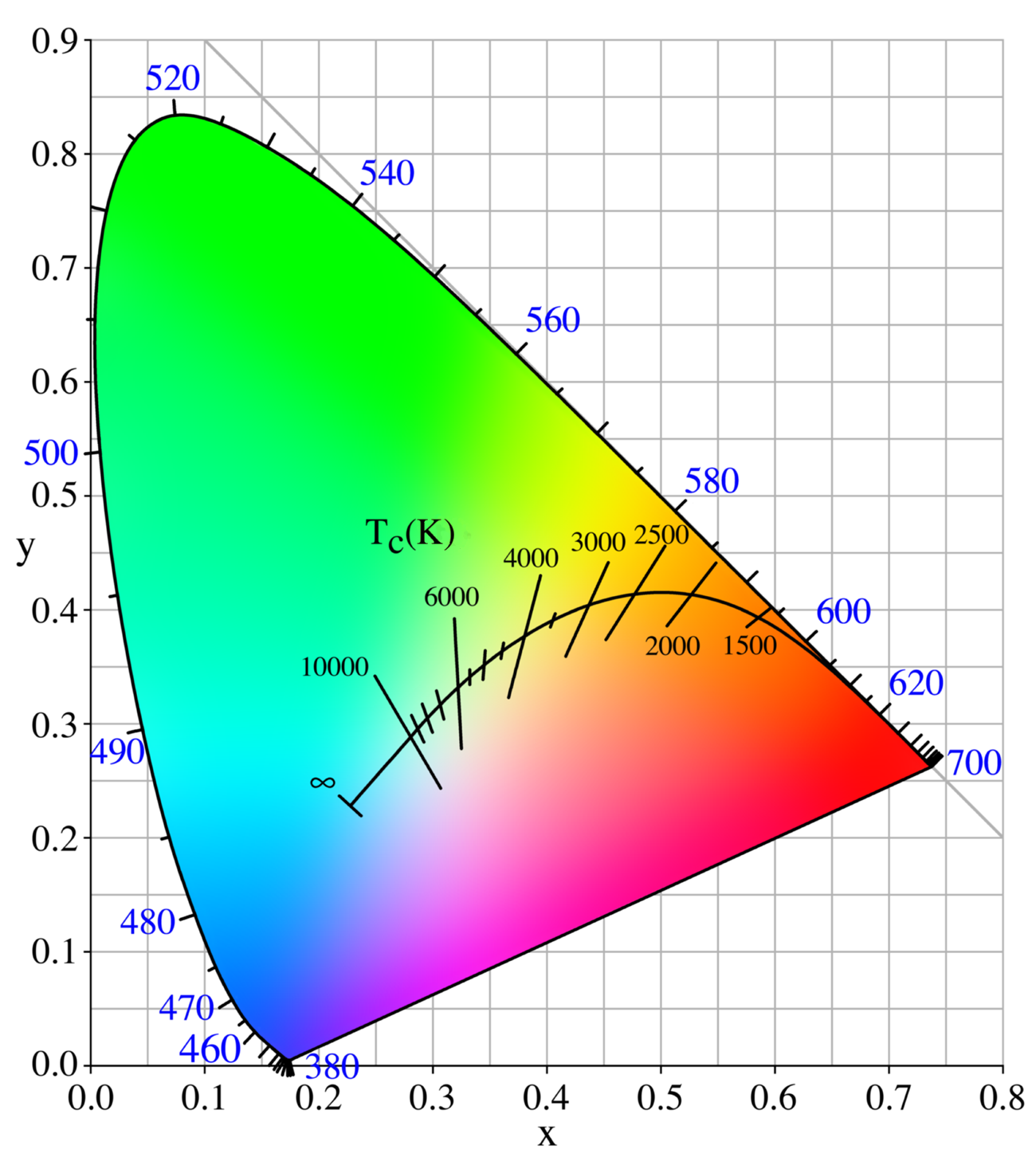
The Planckian locus on a chromaticity diagram. The colours associated with blackbody radiation follow the curved line through red, orange, yellow, white and blue regions; it does not pass through the green region.

For a star whose spectrum closely follows blackbody radiation, a peak in the green part of the visible range does not make the star look green: it still emits substantial amounts of red and blue light, and the combined light is generally perceived as whitish.

The peak wavelength of a spectrum therefore does not, by itself, determine the colour seen by an observer. This explains why the Sun, whose visible spectrum peaks in the green region, appears approximately white rather than green.

This general pattern is not a universal rule for every type of star. A star's atmosphere can absorb or emit light at particular wavelengths, and in some objects these effects can alter the overall spectrum enough to produce unusual perceived colours.

White dwarfs, whose atmospheres can be much denser than those of ordinary stars, provide examples of this effect.

== Examples of green stars ==
=== WD J1330+6435 ===
WD J1330+6435 is a white dwarf in the constellation Draco, approximately 280 light-years from Earth. In a 2026 study of white-dwarf colours, spectral modelling indicated that it would appear chartreuse green if viewed closely enough for its disc to be resolved. The researchers identified it as the first known star reported to have this colour.

The colour is associated with the white dwarf's unusual atmospheric composition. Material from a planetary system has enriched its outer layers with elements including sodium, calcium and lithium.

=== WD J1351+2645 ===
Spectrum of WD J1351+2645

WD J1351+2645 is a white dwarf located in the constellation Boötes. (Note: The star's identifier signifies J2000 coordinates of Right Ascension 13h 51m and Declination +26° 45', placing it within Bootes.) Classified as a DZ white dwarf, it exhibits a modelled pale green hue attributed to strong absorption by ionized calcium (Ca II) at blue wavelengths, combined with a steep Rayleigh–Jeans tail at red wavelengths.

It was identified as a green-hued object in the same study that reported the more vividly green WD J1330+6435.

=== WD J0851+1543 ===
Spectrum of WD J0851+1543

WD J0851+1543 is a white dwarf located in the constellation Cancer. (Note: The star's identifier signifies J2000 coordinates of Right Ascension 08h 51m and Declination +15° 43', placing it within Cancer.) Its modelled appearance is pale green, with a hue between sRGB green and cyan.

The authors considered its green classification reliable because its atmospheric model was based on a spectrum with a high signal-to-noise ratio. Its modelled colour also varies across the stellar disc, with subtle differences in hue toward the outer limb.

Its green appearance is attributed to strong calcium ion (Ca II) absorption at blue wavelengths and a steep Rayleigh–Jeans tail at red wavelengths.

== Related phenomena ==
There have been other astronomical objects and effects that sometimes appeared to be green stars.

=== Beta Librae ===
The star Beta Librae (Zubeneschamali, β Lib) is usually described as appearing white to modern observers, viewed through modern telescopes. However, its colour is controversial, and many earlier observers stated that they saw it as green. There seems to be no consensus about what its colour really is, and no generally accepted explanation for why some observers have seen it as green.

=== Complementary colour contrast ===
There are a few stars in double or multiple star systems that appear greenish, even though they are blue or white under typical viewing conditions. This can happen if the star system contains a large red or orange star. Colour contrast effects cause objects close to the reddish star to appear slightly greenish (and vice versa: complementary colors).

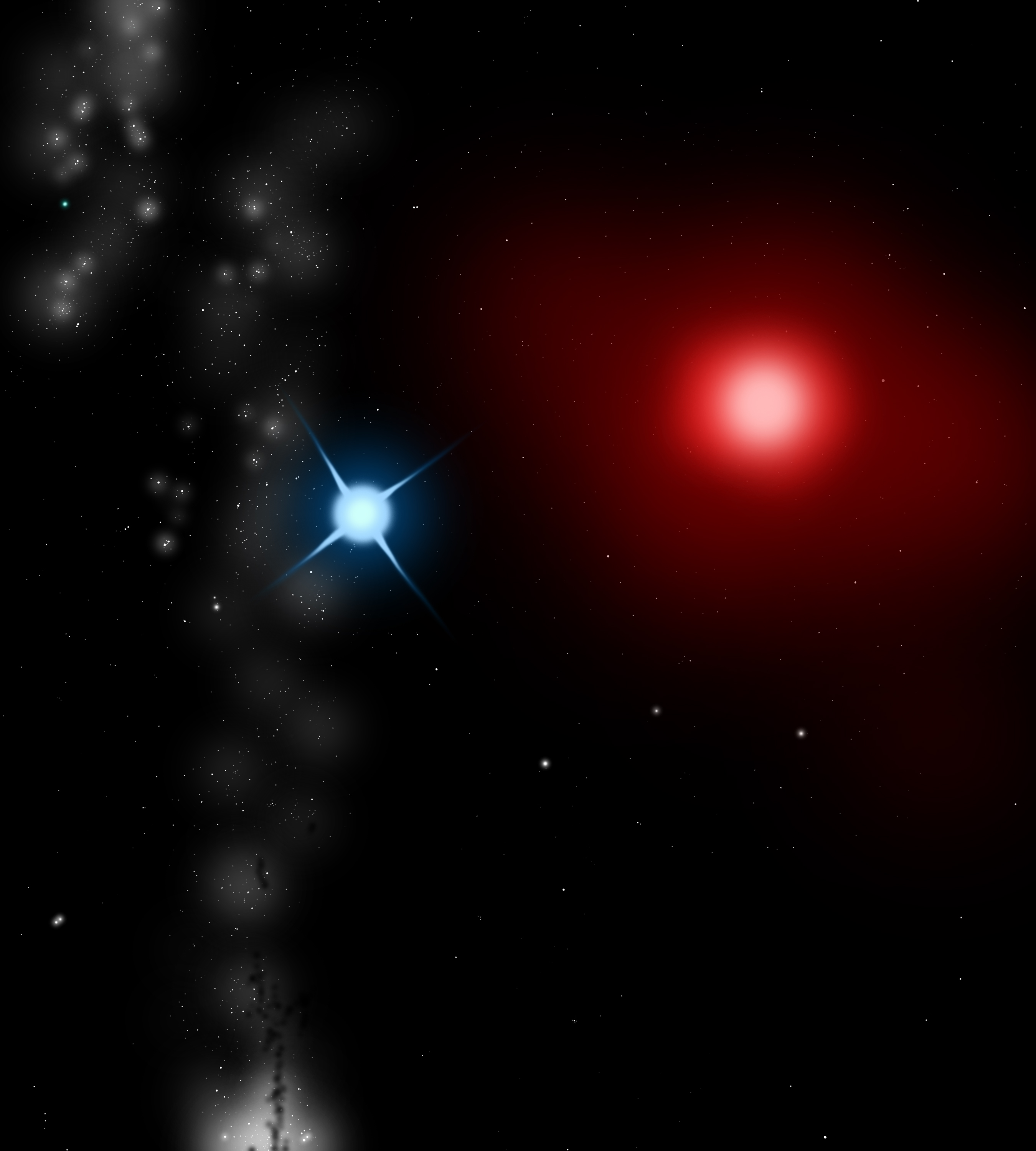
Antares (red) and its companion star, Antares B

==== Antares ====
The classical example is Antares (Alpha Scorpii or α Sco), the brightest star in the constellation Scorpius: The primary of the double star system is the red supergiant primary α Sco A; it has a blue companion α Sco B. When viewed at low-enough power so that the light of the two stars is seen combined, some observers describe the colour as greenish.

==== Almach ====
Other examples include the star system Almach (γ¹ and γ² Andromedae) a golden-yellow star next to a dimmer, indigo-blue star about 350 light years away.

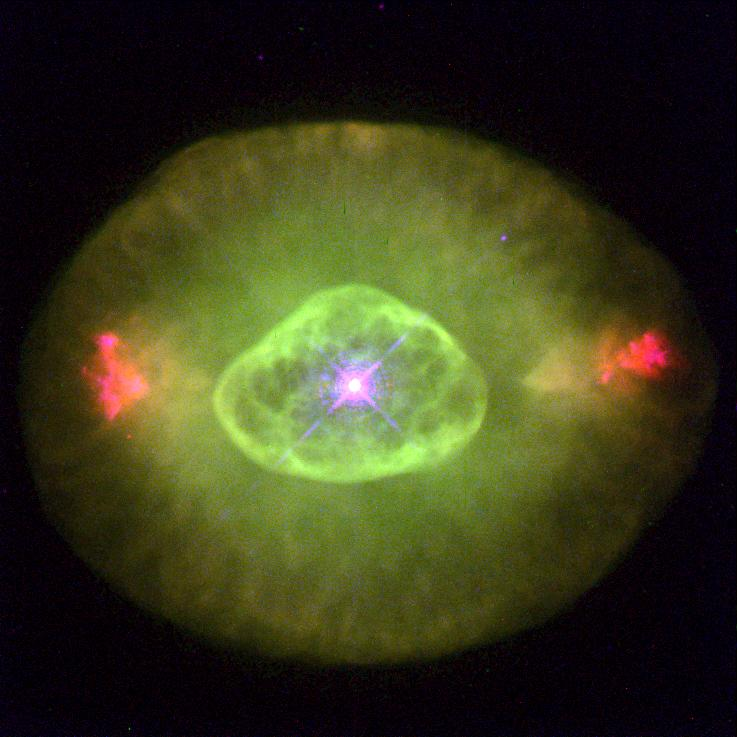
The green planetary nebula NGC 6826

==== σ Cassiopeiae ====
Another is the Sigma Cassiopeiae (σ Cas) star system, a binary star 1,500 light-years from Earth. σ Cas‑A is a greenish-hued magnitude 5.0 primary, next to magnitude 7.3 blue-hued secondary σ Cas‑B.

==== Planetary nebulae ====
Some planetary nebulae themselves glow with the green O^{II} emission lines, especially if the nebula is enriched oxygen, well irradiated by its central late-stage star or white dwarf. These nebulae, or the stars within them (usually bluish or white Wolf-Rayet stars) may appear to be green when viewed in combination at low power. Examples include the planetary nebulae NGC 6572, NGC 6826, and NGC 7009.

=== Uranus ===
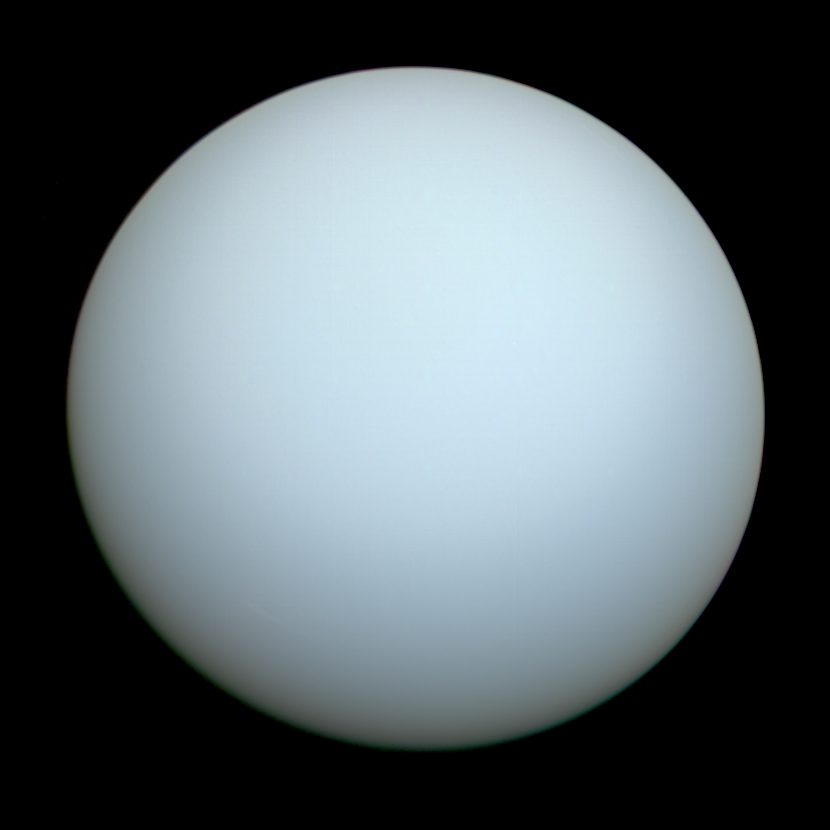
Uranus

The planet Uranus occasionally appeared in ancient star catalogues, and in more recent catalogues before William Herschel discovered that it is a planet—most recently as 34 Tauri in Flamsteed's catalogue. It appears as a greenish or blue-green dot in binoculars or a small telescope. Uranus appears more green during its solstices and more blue near its equinoxes, because the composition of its atmosphere varies somewhat between its poles and its equator.

=== The Sun ===
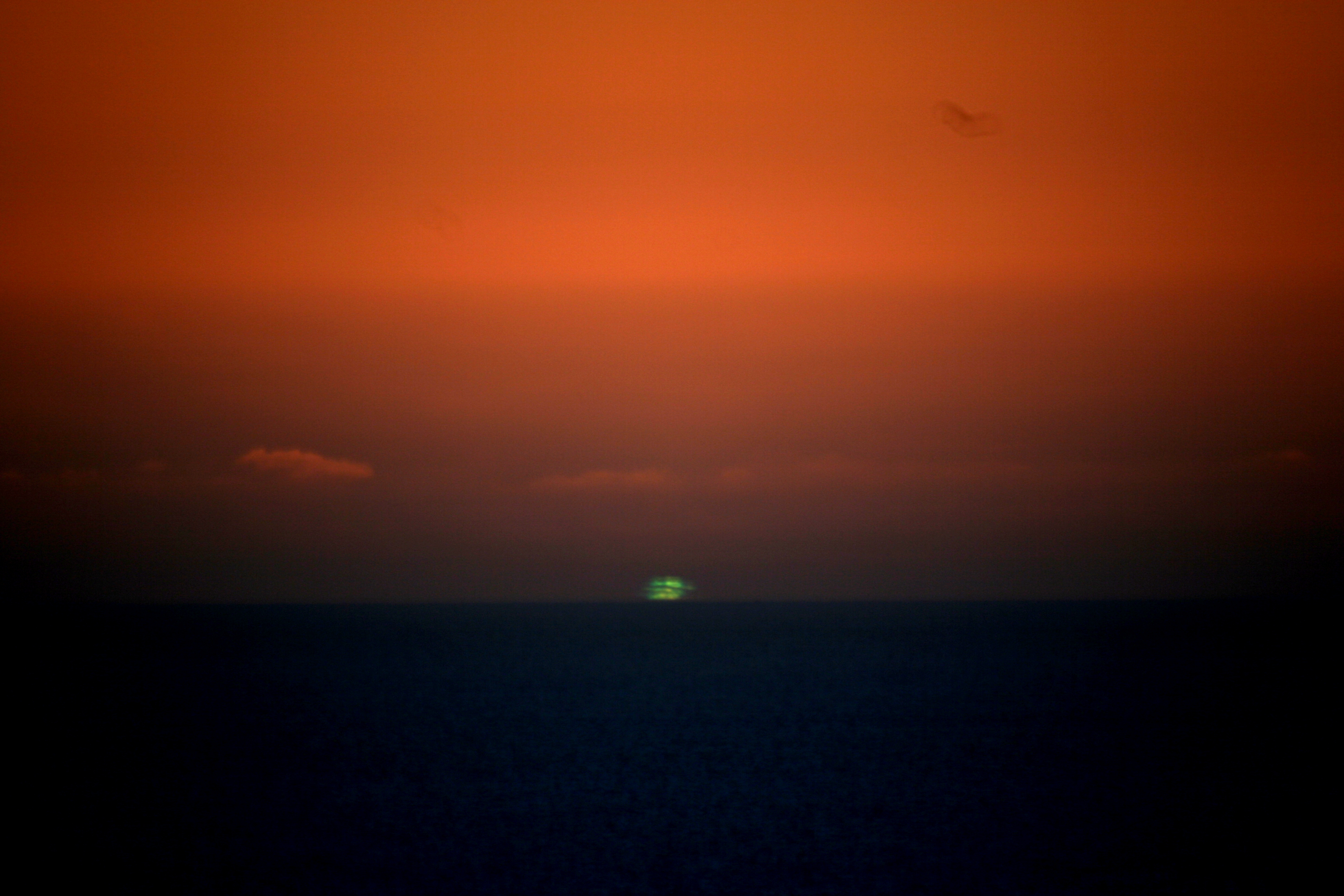
Green flash

The Sun can sometimes appear as a green spot for a second or two as it is rising or setting: this is known as a green flash. Roughly speaking, the red light from the Sun is blocked by Earth, the blue light is scattered by the atmosphere, and the green light is refracted by the atmosphere to the observer.

A similar effect can occasionally be seen with other astronomical objects such as the moon and bright planets.

Furthermore, the Sun emits more green photons than any other colour; i.e., it peaks in the green part of the visible spectrum.
