= Maureen Duffy =

English poet and novelist (1933–2026)

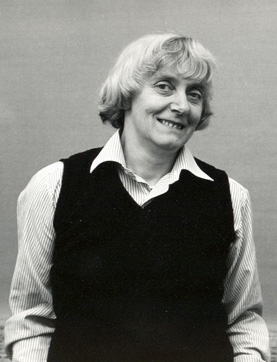
- Born: Maureen Patricia Duffy; 21 October 1933; Worthing, Sussex, England
- Died: 27 May 2026 (aged 92)
- Education: King's College London
- Occupations: Novelist, poet, playwright, nonfiction author, activist
- Awards: RSL Pioneer Prize
- Website: www.alcs.co.uk/about-alcs/history/

Maureen Patricia Duffy (21 October 1933 – 27 May 2026) was an English poet, playwright, novelist and non-fiction author. Long an activist covering such issues as gay rights and animal rights, she campaigned especially on behalf of authors. Duffy received the Benson Medal from the Royal Society of Literature in 2004 for her lifelong writings. In 2025, she was announced as the inaugural winner of the RSL Pioneer Prize, founded by Bernardine Evaristo, to be awarded to a different woman writer aged over 60 every year for ten years.

== Early life and education ==
Maureen Patricia Duffy was born in Worthing, Sussex, on 21 October 1933. Her family came from Stratford, East London. Her Irish father left when she was two months old. To add to an already difficult childhood, Maureen's mother died when Maureen was 15. She then moved to Stratford in East London, where she had family living.

Duffy drew on her tough childhood in That's How It Was, her most autobiographical novel. Her working-class roots, experience of "class and cultural division" and close relations with her mother are key influences on her work. She developed an early passion for "stories of Ancient Greece and Rome, folk tales of Ireland and Wales, tales of knightly chivalry and poetry".

Her mother, Duffy recalled, "early on instilled in me that the one thing they can't take away from you is education". she completed her schooling and supported herself before university by teaching at junior schools. She gained a degree in English at King's College London in 1956, and her archive is now held at the King's archives. Duffy then taught in Naples till 1958 and in secondary schools in the London area till 1961.

== Early work ==
Duffy's earliest ambition was to be a poet. She won her first such prize at the age of 17 with a poem printed in Adam magazine, soon followed by publication in The Listener and elsewhere. She later edited a poetry magazine called the sixties (1960–1961).

At King's she completed her first full-length play, Pearson, and submitted it for a competition judged by Kenneth Tynan, drama critic at The Observer. This brought an invitation to join the Royal Court Writers Group in 1958, when its members included Edward Bond, Ann Jellicoe, John Arden, William Gaskill and Arnold Wesker.

Duffy started writing full-time after being commissioned by Granada Television to write a screenplay Josie – broadcast on ITV in 1961 as part of the Younger Generation series – about a teenage girl, hoping to break out of factory work by pursuing a talent for fashion design. The advance of £450 enabled Duffy to buy a houseboat to live in. Pearson won the Corporation of London Festival Playwright's Prize in 1962 and was performed under the title The Lay Off at the Guildhall School of Music and Drama. It drew on Duffy's experience of vacation jobs in factories. Pearson/The Lay Off is a modern reworking of Piers Plowman, and an early example of Duffy's inclusion of black characters in prominent roles and her opposition to racism. The set for Room for Us All recreates a small block of flats, with residents interacting, and the audience looking in as each is lit up. Two and Two Makes Five is about a teacher disillusioned by constraints on school culture deciding to quit the profession.

The play The Silk Room, about a male pop group, was produced at the Palace Theatre, Watford in 1966. An episode of TV drama Sanctuary was commissioned by Associated Rediffusion and broadcast on ITV in 1967.

Duffy's first novel, That's How It Was (1962), was written at a publisher's suggestion and won great acclaim. While many reviewers dwelt on its vivid depiction of a working-class childhood, Duffy also emphasised that her goal was to show the influences that could form a writer and those that could encourage a preference for same-sex love.

Her first openly gay novel was The Microcosm (1966), set in and around the famous lesbian Gateways Club in London (renamed the House of Shades). It was the first to depict a wide range of contrasting gay women of different ages, classes and ethnicities – and historical periods – to make a point that "there are dozens of ways of being queer". Widely reviewed, it sold well and inspired lesbian readers, including U. A. Fanthorpe and Mary McIntosh.

Duffy's other early novels deal with the life of creative artists. The Single Eye (1964) has a talented photographer gradually finding that his wife has become his rival, a restriction that holds back his life and his art, so that for the sake of his creativity and identity he must leave her. The Paradox Players (1967), about a writer, draws on Duffy's experience of living on a houseboat. It shows the attractions of the freer life in an alternative community, together with its shortcomings (including rats in the food cupboard). The paradox lies in the difficulty of sustaining this as a permanent lifestyle, as the pressures of the outside world break through.

== Notable works ==
=== Plays ===
In 1968, Duffy was one of five women novelists commissioned by Joan Plowright to write a play for the National Theatre with an all-female cast. Duffy's Rites was selected for a second run at the Old Vic, then the home of the National Theatre, and has often been performed since. Set in ladies' public toilets, it climaxes with an attack by a group of women on a "male", discovered too late to be a woman in a suit. It is described by Duffy as "black farce... pitched between fantasy and naturalism". Rites was shown with Old Tyme and Solo at the ADC Theatre in Cambridge in 1970. A sequel, Washouse, was set in a launderette run by a trans woman. All these plays had contemporary settings, but drew thematically on Greek or Roman myths (the Bacchae, children of Uranus, Narcissus, Venus and Diana).

In 1971, Duffy was commissioned to write the second episode of the ITV series Upstairs Downstairs. Her play about the last hour of Virginia Woolf's life, A Nightingale in Bloomsbury Square, was performed in 1973 at the Hampstead Theatre Club, and also featured Vita Sackville-West and Freud as imagined by Virginia.

Duffy's BBC radio plays include The Passionate Shepherdess on Aphra Behn (1977) and Only Goodnight (1981) on Edith Somerville and Violet Martin (Martin Ross). Family Trees (1984) deals with family history research. Afterword, a witty two-hander about a writer under pressure from a benefits officer (a response to Václav Havel's play Conversation) was performed by Manchester University Drama Society in 1983. Megrim, set in a mythical matriarchy in the Welsh mountains, was performed at King Alfred's School of Speech and Drama, Winchester, in 1984. The Masque of Henry Purcell was staged at Southwark Playhouse in London in 1995, while Sappho Singing was performed there in 2010 and in Brighton in 2011.

Rites and A Nightingale in Bloomsbury Square have been published. Typescripts of other plays are accessible in King's College London Archive. A survey and analysis of Duffy's drama is available in Lucy Kay, (2005).

Duffy's play Hilda and Virginia was shown at the Jermyn Street Theatre on 27 February – 3 March 2018. The twinned monologues performed by Sarah Crowden focused on the last evening of Virginia Woolf's life and several episodes in the life of Abbess Hilda of Whitby as recorded by Bede, where Hilda tells of the poet Caedmon and the shift in the church from Irish to Roman Catholicism.

=== Poetry ===
Duffy's first of nine poetry volumes appeared in 1968. They included Environmental Studies (2013), which was long-listed for the Green Carnation Prize, and most recently Pictures from an Exhibition (2016). Her Collected Poems, 1949–84 appeared in 1985.

Her poetry ranges widely, in form from villanelle to free verse, and in content from erotic and lyrical love poetry to a humanist mass; family memories to political comment. Her work often references earlier poets from a contemporary angle, as in "Piers Plowless". Alison Hennegan credits Duffy with "the first modern lesbian love poems, unabashed and unapologetic. These showed what was possible." Their major concern is "sympathy for the human (or animal) condition, devoid of sentimentality or condescension".

=== Fiction ===
Wounds (1969) creates a mosaic of London life by interweaving the voices of a range of characters, including a black mother, a local politician and a gay theatre director, whose lives contrast with the uplifting experience of two passionate lovers, whose encounters recur through the book. Love Child (1971) has a narrator whose gender is unstated, Kit, a child whose jealousy of its mother's relationship with her lover Ajax (also of unknown gender) has tragic consequences – an Oedipal theme. Kit has also been identified with Cupid and the mother with Venus.

Duffy's trilogy about London continues with Capital (1975). The lives of a professor, Emery, and a self-educated, homeless eccentric Meepers, twine around "Queen's" (a fictionalised version of King's College), interspersed with narratives of Londoners of various periods, including 14th-century prostitutes and Stone Age hunters. Many critics saw this as her most impressive novel to date. Lorna Sage noted her writing "becoming altogether more carnivalesque – more deadpan and more comic." The third of the trilogy, Londoners: an Elegy (1983), brings dry humour to the challenges of the contemporary writing world, through a narrator of unspecified gender writing on Francois Villon. Londoners is also inspired by Dante's Inferno and draws parallels with Villon's medieval Paris; it is also notable for depicting gay pubs and characters.

Change (1987), set in World War II, includes a group of apes as one set of narrative voices in a mosaic of stories of a wide range of ordinary people. Many of Duffy's later novels use contrasting and complementary narratives of past and present, a technique she first applied in The Microcosm. Restitution (1998) (long-listed for the Booker Prize), eventually brings past and present together, as a young London woman gradually finds her identity unexpectedly altered by events in Nazi Germany half a century before.

Some of Duffy's novels deploy the storytelling techniques of thrillers, including I want to go to Moscow (1973), Housespy (1978), Occam's Razor (1991), Alchemy (2004), The Orpheus Trail (2009) and In Times Like These (2013). Political passion often animates her work. The Microcosm makes the case for acceptance of lesbians; Gor Saga challenges assumptions about the gulf between humans and other species; In Times Like These warns of dangers in possible Scottish independence and in withdrawal of England and Wales from the European Union. Scarborough Fear (written under a pseudonym in 1982) is a horror story with a modern setting and Gothic elements, engaging its young narrator in a psychological battle for survival.

=== Non-fiction ===
Duffy's literary biography of Aphra Behn (1977) led to rediscovery of the 17th-century playwright, the first woman to earn a living by writing, and established fresh facts about her life. Duffy has also edited Behn's plays and her novel Love Letters Between a Nobleman and His Sister, and written introductions to other works of hers.

Her other non-fiction includes The Erotic World of Faery (1972), a Freudian study of eroticism in faery fantasy literature; Inherit the Earth (1979), a social history of her family and their roots in Thaxted, Essex; a biography of the composer Henry Purcell (1995); and a historical survey of how myths of English identity came to develop: England: The Making of the Myth (2001).

== Writing style ==
Duffy's work is often framed by Freudian ideas and Greek mythology. Her writing is distinctive for using contrasting voices or streams of consciousness, often including the perspectives of outsiders. Her novels have been linked to a European literary tradition of exploring reality through the use of language and questioning, rather than traditional linear narrative. James Joyce in particular and Modernism in general are influences, as is Joyce Cary. "Duffy has inspired many other writers and proved that the English novel need not be realistic and domestic, but can be fantastical, experimental and political." Her writing in all forms is noted for an "eye for detail and ear for language". and "powerful intense imagery".

Her early plays often depict working-class life with humour and evocative language. She joined the Royal Court writers' group at a time when the social realist school of such playwrights as John Osborne and Arnold Wesker was transforming British drama. Some of her plays have been described as "anarchic... dealing with taboo subjects... 'total theater' reminiscent of the ideas of Antonin Artaud and Jean Genet, employing Brechtian techniques." Jean-Paul Sartre has also had an influence.

Duffy's affinity to London, present and past, and its cosmopolitan inhabitants often features in her writing, which celebrates diversity, regardless of class, nationality, ethnicity, gender, sexuality or species. She advocated "an ethic of compassion" towards human and animal rights.

== Activism ==
A lifelong socialist, Duffy was involved in early CND marches. A humanist, she was the inaugural President of the Gay Humanist Group (which later became LGBT Humanists).

=== Gay rights ===
Duffy was the first gay woman in British public life to be open about her sexual orientation. She "came out publicly in her work in the early 1960s", and made public comments before male homosexual acts were decriminalised in 1967. In 1977, she published The Ballad of the Blasphemy Trial, a broadside against the trial of the Gay News newspaper for "blasphemous libel".

As first President of the Gay Humanist Group from 1980 (renamed GALHA, the Gay and Lesbian Humanist Association, in 1987), Duffy spoke out on many issues, such as human rights for those with HIV/AIDS. At the 1988 TUC conference as President of the Writers' Guild of Great Britain, she succeeded with a motion deploring the passing of Section 28 "as an infringement of the basic right to free speech and expression". Duffy was a patron of the British Humanist Association (Humanists UK) since GALHA became part of it in 2012.

Duffy was often invited by LGBT groups to read her work. In 1991, she appeared in Saturday Night Out on BBC 2, saying that progress in gay rights since her earliest TV appearances had been more limited than she had hoped. In 1995, she was placed by Gay Times as one of the 200 most influential lesbian and gay people in Britain. She was included on the Independent on Sunday's Pink List in 2005. In 2014, she gained an Icon Award for Outstanding Lifetime Achievement from Attitude magazine.

=== Animal rights ===
A vegetarian and a campaigner for animal rights from 1967, who signed a letter to The Times in 1970, along with Elizabeth Taylor and others, promising never to wear fur, Duffy's thinking appeared in her book Men & Beasts: an Animal Rights Handbook (1984). Duffy was an anti-vivisectionist.

Animal rights become central in two of her novels: I Want to Go to Moscow (1973, in the US: All Heaven in a Rage) and Gor Saga, the 1981 story of Gor, born half-gorilla, half-human, televised in 1988 in a three-part miniseries called First Born starring Charles Dance. Duffy became Vice President of Beauty Without Cruelty in 1975.

=== Authors' rights ===
Duffy, with author and activist Brigid Brophy, Michael Levey and two others founded the Writers' Action Group in 1972, which gained more than 700 author members. Their campaign for Public Lending Right (annual payments to authors based on public-library loans of their books) succeeded legally in 1979 after support for it at the 1978 TUC conference. She joined a delegation to meet Prime Minister James Callaghan in 1977. She remained an authority on copyright, intellectual property law and secondary author rights.

"For almost as long as she has been writing for a living, Maureen Duffy has worked to protect the rights of writers, which have been jeopardised by successive changes in technology and in the book market." While continuing to defend Public Lending Right, Duffy has also contributed to a campaign for authors to be paid when their work is photocopied, and helped to found the Authors' Licensing and Collecting Society, which she chaired for 15 years and remained its president. She held senior positions for many years in the Writers' Guild of Great Britain, the British Copyright Council, the European Writers' Congress (European Writers' Council since 2008) and the Royal Society of Literature. She represented the International Authors Forum at the World Intellectual Property Organization (a specialized United Nations agency).

== Death ==
Duffy died on 27 May 2026, at the age of 92.

== In the media ==
=== Positions ===
- President of Honour of the British Copyright Council
- President of ALCS
- Vice President of Royal Society of Literature
- Fellow of King's College, London

=== Awards and honours ===
- 1985 – Elected a Fellow of the Royal Society of Literature
- 2002 – CISAC gold medal, International Confederation of Societies of Authors and Composers
- 2004 – Benson Medal, Royal Society of Literature
- 2009 – Medal of Honour – Portuguese Society of Authors
- 2011 – Honorary Doctor of Literature – Loughborough University
- 2013 – Honorary Doctor of Literature – University of Kent
- 2015 – Fellow of the English Association
- 2025 – RSL Pioneer Prize

== Selected works ==
=== Fiction ===
- That's How It Was (1962)
- The Single Eye (1964)
- The Microcosm (1966)
- The Paradox Players (1967)
- Wounds (1969)
- Love Child (1971)
- I Want to Go to Moscow: a Lay (in the US as All Heaven in a Rage, 1973)
- Capital: a Fiction (1975)
- Housespy (1978)
- Gor Saga (1981)
- Scarborough Fear, as D. M. Cayer (1982)
- Londoners: an Elegy (1983)
- Change (1987)
- Illuminations: a Fable (1991)
- Occam's Razor (1993)
- Restitution (1998)
- The Orpheus Trail (2009)
- Alchemy (2010)
- In Times Like These: a Fable (2013)
- Sadie and the Seadogs, a children’s book, illustrated by Anita Joice (2021)

=== Non-fiction ===
- The Erotic World of Faery (1972)
- The Passionate Shepherdess: Aphra Behn 1640–87 (1977)
- Inherit the Earth: a Social History (1980)
- Men and Beasts: an Animal Rights Handbook (1984)
- A Thousand Capricious Chances: a History of the Methuen List 1889–1989 (1989)
- Henry Purcell 1659–95 (1994)
- England: the Making of the Myth from Stonehenge to Albert Square (2001)

=== Poetry ===
- Lyrics for the Dog Hour (1968)
- The Venus Touch (1971)
- Actaeon (1973)
- Evesong (1975)
- Memorials of the Quick and the Dead (1979)
- Collected Poems 1949–84 (1985)
- Family Values (2008)
- Environmental Studies (2013)
- Paper Wings (2014) – set to paper by artist Liz Mathews
- Pictures from an Exhibition (2016)
- Past Present: Piers Plowless and Sir Orfeo (2017)
- Wanderer (2020)

=== Drama ===
Plays

- Great Charles (1953)
- Pearson (1956, performed as The Lay Off in 1962)
- Johnny Why (1956)
- Room for Us All (1957)
- Return of the Hero (c. 1958)
- Corp and Slogger (1950s)
- Josie (1961)
- Two and Two Makes Five (c. 1962)
- Treason Never Prospers (1963)
- Villon (1963)
- The Burrow (1964)
- The Silk Room (1966)
- Rites (1968)
- Solo (1970)
- Old Tyme (1970)
- Megrim (1972)
- A Nightingale in Bloomsbury Square (1973)
- Washouse (mid-1970s?)
- The Passionate Shepherdess (1977)
- Only Goodnight (1981)
- Sarah Loves Caroline (1982)
- Afterword (1983)
- Family Trees (1984)
- Voices (1985)
- Unfinished Business (1986)
- The Masque of Henry Purcell (1995)
- Sappho Singing (2010)
- What You Will (2012)
- The Choice (2017)

Plays published

- "Rites" in New Short Plays 2 (Methuen, 1969), and published on its own by Hansom Books 1969, and in Plays by Women, edited by Michelene Wandor (Methuen, 1983)
- "A Nightingale in Bloomsbury Square", in Factions, edited by Giles Gordon and Alex Hamilton (Michael Joseph. 1974)
- "The Choice" and "A Nightingale in Bloomsbury Square" in Hilda and Virginia (Oberon Modern Plays 2018)

=== Art exhibitions ===
- 1969: Prop Art (with Brigid Brophy). London.
- 2014: Paper Wings – a collaboration with Liz Mathews. London
