= Pisces in Chinese astronomy =

The modern constellation Pisces lies across two of the quadrants symbolized by the Black Tortoise of the North (北方玄武, Běi Fāng Xuán Wǔ) and White Tiger of the West (西方白虎, Xī Fāng Bái Hǔ), and Three Enclosures (三垣, Sān Yuán), that divide the sky in traditional Chinese uranography.

The name of the western constellation in modern Chinese is 雙魚座 (shuāng yú zuò), which means "the pair of fish constellation".

== Stars ==
The map of Chinese constellation in constellation Pisces area consists of:

Four Symbols	Mansion (Chinese name)	Romanization	Translation	Asterisms (Chinese name)	Romanization	Translation	Western star name	Proper Name	Chinese star name	Romanization	Translation
Three Enclosures (三垣)	紫微垣	Zǐ Wēi Yuán	Purple Forbidden enclosure								
Three Enclosures (三垣)	紫微垣	Zǐ Wēi Yuán	Purple Forbidden enclosure	傳舍	Chuánshě	Guest House	20 Psc		傳舍一	Chuánshěyī	1st star
Black Tortoise of the North (北方玄武)	室	Shì	Encampment	壘壁陣	Lěibìzhèn	Line of Ramparts					
Black Tortoise of the North (北方玄武)	室	Shì	Encampment	壘壁陣	Lěibìzhèn	Line of Ramparts	27 Psc		壘壁陣九	Lěibìzhènjiǔ	9th star
Black Tortoise of the North (北方玄武)	室	Shì	Encampment	壘壁陣	Lěibìzhèn	Line of Ramparts	29 Psc		壘壁陣十	Lěibìzhènshí	10th star
Black Tortoise of the North (北方玄武)	室	Shì	Encampment	壘壁陣	Lěibìzhèn	Line of Ramparts	33 Psc		壘壁陣十一	Lěibìzhènshíyī	11th star
Black Tortoise of the North (北方玄武)	室	Shì	Encampment	壘壁陣	Lěibìzhèn	Line of Ramparts	30 Psc		壘壁陣十二	Lěibìzhènshíèr	12th star
Black Tortoise of the North (北方玄武)	室	Shì	Encampment	壘壁陣	Lěibìzhèn	Line of Ramparts	20 Psc		壘壁陣增四	Lěibìzhènzēngsì	4th additional star
Black Tortoise of the North (北方玄武)	室	Shì	Encampment	壘壁陣	Lěibìzhèn	Line of Ramparts	24 Psc		壘壁陣增五	Lěibìzhènzēngwǔ	5th additional star
Black Tortoise of the North (北方玄武)	室	Shì	Encampment	壘壁陣	Lěibìzhèn	Line of Ramparts	4 Cet		壘壁陣增六	Lěibìzhènzēngliù	6th additional star
Black Tortoise of the North (北方玄武)	室	Shì	Encampment	壘壁陣	Lěibìzhèn	Line of Ramparts	5 Cet		壘壁陣增七	Lěibìzhènzēngqī	7th additional star
Black Tortoise of the North (北方玄武)	壁	Bì	Wall	壁	Bì	Wall					
Black Tortoise of the North (北方玄武)	壁	Bì	Wall	壁	Bì	Wall	37 Psc		壁宿增十一	Bìsùzēngshíyī	11th additional star
Black Tortoise of the North (北方玄武)	壁	Bì	Wall	壁	Bì	Wall	42 Psc		壁宿增十二	Bìsùzēngshíèr	12th additional star
Black Tortoise of the North (北方玄武)	壁	Bì	Wall	壁	Bì	Wall	43 Psc		壁宿增十三	Bìsùzēngshísān	13th additional star
Black Tortoise of the North (北方玄武)	壁	Bì	Wall	壁	Bì	Wall	49 Psc		壁宿增十四	Bìsùzēngshísì	14th additional star
Black Tortoise of the North (北方玄武)	壁	Bì	Wall	壁	Bì	Wall	48 Psc		壁宿增十五	Bìsùzēngshíwǔ	15th additional star
Black Tortoise of the North (北方玄武)	壁	Bì	Wall	壁	Bì	Wall	40 Psc		壁宿增十六	Bìsùzēngshíliù	16th additional star
Black Tortoise of the North (北方玄武)	壁	Bì	Wall	壁	Bì	Wall	39 Psc		壁宿增十七	Bìsùzēngshíqī	17th additional star
Black Tortoise of the North (北方玄武)	壁	Bì	Wall	壁	Bì	Wall	47 Psc		壁宿增二十	Bìsùzēngèrshí	20th additional star
Black Tortoise of the North (北方玄武)	壁	Bì	Wall	壁	Bì	Wall	46 Psc		壁宿增二十一	Bìsùzēngèrshíyī	21st additional star
Black Tortoise of the North (北方玄武)	壁	Bì	Wall	壁	Bì	Wall	52 Psc		壁宿增二十二	Bìsùzēngèrshíèr	22nd additional star
Black Tortoise of the North (北方玄武)	壁	Bì	Wall	霹靂	Pīlì	Thunderbolt					
Black Tortoise of the North (北方玄武)	壁	Bì	Wall	霹靂	Pīlì	Thunderbolt	β Psc	Fumalsamakah			
Black Tortoise of the North (北方玄武)	壁	Bì	Wall	霹靂	Pīlì	Thunderbolt	β Psc	Fumalsamakah	霹靂一	Pīlìyī	1st star
Black Tortoise of the North (北方玄武)	壁	Bì	Wall	霹靂	Pīlì	Thunderbolt	β Psc	Fumalsamakah	九卿	Jiǔqīng	Nine senior officers
Black Tortoise of the North (北方玄武)	壁	Bì	Wall	霹靂	Pīlì	Thunderbolt	γ Psc	Yunyu	霹靂二	Pīlìèr	2nd star
Black Tortoise of the North (北方玄武)	壁	Bì	Wall	霹靂	Pīlì	Thunderbolt	θ Psc		霹靂三	Pīlìsān	3rd star
Black Tortoise of the North (北方玄武)	壁	Bì	Wall	霹靂	Pīlì	Thunderbolt	ι Psc	Puwuh Atarung	霹靂四	Pīlìsì	4th star
Black Tortoise of the North (北方玄武)	壁	Bì	Wall	霹靂	Pīlì	Thunderbolt	ω Psc	Pili	霹靂五	Pīlìwu	5th star
Black Tortoise of the North (北方玄武)	壁	Bì	Wall	霹靂	Pīlì	Thunderbolt	3 Psc		霹雳增一	Pīlìzēngyī	1st additional star
Black Tortoise of the North (北方玄武)	壁	Bì	Wall	霹靂	Pīlì	Thunderbolt	2 Psc		霹雳增二	Pīlìzēngèr	2nd additional star
Black Tortoise of the North (北方玄武)	壁	Bì	Wall	霹靂	Pīlì	Thunderbolt	5 Psc		霹雳增三	Pīlìzēngsān	3rd additional star
Black Tortoise of the North (北方玄武)	壁	Bì	Wall	霹靂	Pīlì	Thunderbolt	7 Psc		霹靂增四	Pīlìzēngsì	4th additional star
Black Tortoise of the North (北方玄武)	壁	Bì	Wall	霹靂	Pīlì	Thunderbolt	26 Psc		霹靂增八	Pīlìzēngbā	8th additional star
Black Tortoise of the North (北方玄武)	壁	Bì	Wall	雲雨	Yúnyǔ	Cloud and Rain					
Black Tortoise of the North (北方玄武)	壁	Bì	Wall	雲雨	Yúnyǔ	Cloud and Rain	κ Psc		雲雨一	Yúnyǔyī	1st star
Black Tortoise of the North (北方玄武)	壁	Bì	Wall	雲雨	Yúnyǔ	Cloud and Rain	12 Psc		雲雨二	Yúnyǔèr	2nd star
Black Tortoise of the North (北方玄武)	壁	Bì	Wall	雲雨	Yúnyǔ	Cloud and Rain	21 Psc		雲雨三	Yúnyǔsān	3rd star
Black Tortoise of the North (北方玄武)	壁	Bì	Wall	雲雨	Yúnyǔ	Cloud and Rain	λ Psc		雲雨四	Yúnyǔsì	4th star
Black Tortoise of the North (北方玄武)	壁	Bì	Wall	雲雨	Yúnyǔ	Cloud and Rain	11 Psc		雲雨增一	Yúnyǔzēngyī	1st additional star
Black Tortoise of the North (北方玄武)	壁	Bì	Wall	雲雨	Yúnyǔ	Cloud and Rain	14 Psc		雲雨增二	Yúnyǔzēngèr	2nd additional star
Black Tortoise of the North (北方玄武)	壁	Bì	Wall	雲雨	Yúnyǔ	Cloud and Rain	13 Psc		雲雨增三	Yúnyǔzēngsān	3rd additional star
Black Tortoise of the North (北方玄武)	壁	Bì	Wall	雲雨	Yúnyǔ	Cloud and Rain	9 Psc		雲雨增四	Yúnyǔzēngsì	4th additional star
Black Tortoise of the North (北方玄武)	壁	Bì	Wall	雲雨	Yúnyǔ	Cloud and Rain	15 Psc		雲雨增五	Yúnyǔzēngwǔ	5th additional star
Black Tortoise of the North (北方玄武)	壁	Bì	Wall	雲雨	Yúnyǔ	Cloud and Rain	16 Psc		雲雨增六	Yúnyǔzēngliù	6th additional star
Black Tortoise of the North (北方玄武)	壁	Bì	Wall	雲雨	Yúnyǔ	Cloud and Rain	19 Psc		雲雨增七	Yúnyǔzēngqī	7th additional star
Black Tortoise of the North (北方玄武)	壁	Bì	Wall	雲雨	Yúnyǔ	Cloud and Rain	22 Psc		雲雨增八	Yúnyǔzēngbā	8th additional star
Black Tortoise of the North (北方玄武)	壁	Bì	Wall	雲雨	Yúnyǔ	Cloud and Rain	25 Psc		雲雨增九	Yúnyǔzēngjiǔ	9th additional star
Black Tortoise of the North (北方玄武)	壁	Bì	Wall	土公	Tǔgōng	Official for Earthworks and Buildings					
Black Tortoise of the North (北方玄武)	壁	Bì	Wall	土公	Tǔgōng	Official for Earthworks and Buildings	32 Psc		土公一	Tǔgōngyī	1st star
Black Tortoise of the North (北方玄武)	壁	Bì	Wall	土公	Tǔgōng	Official for Earthworks and Buildings	45 Psc		土公二	Tǔgōngèr	2nd star
Black Tortoise of the North (北方玄武)	壁	Bì	Wall	土公	Tǔgōng	Official for Earthworks and Buildings	31 Psc		土公增一	Tǔgōngzēngyī	1st additional star
Black Tortoise of the North (北方玄武)	壁	Bì	Wall	土公	Tǔgōng	Official for Earthworks and Buildings	34 Psc		土公增二	Tǔgōngzēngèr	2nd additional star
Black Tortoise of the North (北方玄武)	壁	Bì	Wall	土公	Tǔgōng	Official for Earthworks and Buildings	35 Psc		土公增三	Tǔgōngzēngsān	3rd additional star
Black Tortoise of the North (北方玄武)	壁	Bì	Wall	土公	Tǔgōng	Official for Earthworks and Buildings	36 Psc		土公增四	Tǔgōngzēngsì	4th additional star
Black Tortoise of the North (北方玄武)	壁	Bì	Wall	土公	Tǔgōng	Official for Earthworks and Buildings	41 Psc		土公增五	Tǔgōngzēngwǔ	5th additional star
Black Tortoise of the North (北方玄武)	壁	Bì	Wall	土公	Tǔgōng	Official for Earthworks and Buildings	51 Psc		土公增六	Tǔgōngzēngliù	6th additional star
Black Tortoise of the North (北方玄武)	壁	Bì	Wall	土公	Tǔgōng	Official for Earthworks and Buildings	44 Psc		土公增七	Tǔgōngzēngqī	7th additional star
White Tiger of the West (西方白虎)	奎	Kuí	Legs	奎	Kuí	Legs					
White Tiger of the West (西方白虎)	奎	Kuí	Legs	奎	Kuí	Legs	65 Psc		奎宿三	Kuísùsān	3rd star
White Tiger of the West (西方白虎)	奎	Kuí	Legs	奎	Kuí	Legs	σ Psc		奎宿十	Kuísùshí	10th star
White Tiger of the West (西方白虎)	奎	Kuí	Legs	奎	Kuí	Legs	τ Psc		奎宿十一	Kuísùshíyī	11th star
White Tiger of the West (西方白虎)	奎	Kuí	Legs	奎	Kuí	Legs	91 Psc		奎宿十二	Kuísùshíèr	12th star
White Tiger of the West (西方白虎)	奎	Kuí	Legs	奎	Kuí	Legs	υ Psc		奎宿十三	Kuísùshísān	13th star
White Tiger of the West (西方白虎)	奎	Kuí	Legs	奎	Kuí	Legs	φ Psc		奎宿十四	Kuísùshísì	14th star
White Tiger of the West (西方白虎)	奎	Kuí	Legs	奎	Kuí	Legs	χ Psc		奎宿十五	Kuísùshíwǔ	15th star
White Tiger of the West (西方白虎)	奎	Kuí	Legs	奎	Kuí	Legs	ψ¹ Psc		奎宿十六	Kuísùshíliù	16th star
White Tiger of the West (西方白虎)	奎	Kuí	Legs	奎	Kuí	Legs	55 Psc		奎宿增二	Kuísùzēngèr	2nd additional star
White Tiger of the West (西方白虎)	奎	Kuí	Legs	奎	Kuí	Legs	54 Psc		奎宿增三	Kuísùzēngsān	3rd additional star
White Tiger of the West (西方白虎)	奎	Kuí	Legs	奎	Kuí	Legs	59 Psc		奎宿增四	Kuísùzēngsì	4th additional star
White Tiger of the West (西方白虎)	奎	Kuí	Legs	奎	Kuí	Legs	64 Psc		奎宿增五	Kuísùzēngwǔ	5th additional star
White Tiger of the West (西方白虎)	奎	Kuí	Legs	奎	Kuí	Legs	66 Psc		奎宿增六	Kuísùzēngliù	6th additional star
White Tiger of the West (西方白虎)	奎	Kuí	Legs	奎	Kuí	Legs	ψ³ Psc		奎宿增七	Kuísùzēngqī	7th additional star
White Tiger of the West (西方白虎)	奎	Kuí	Legs	奎	Kuí	Legs	ψ² Psc		奎宿增八	Kuísùzēngbā	8th additional star
White Tiger of the West (西方白虎)	奎	Kuí	Legs	奎	Kuí	Legs	67 Psc		奎宿增十	Kuísùzēngshí	10th additional star
White Tiger of the West (西方白虎)	奎	Kuí	Legs	奎	Kuí	Legs	68 Psc		奎宿增十一	Kuísùzēngshíyī	11th additional star
White Tiger of the West (西方白虎)	奎	Kuí	Legs	奎	Kuí	Legs	82 Psc		奎宿增十三	Kuísùzēngshísān	13th additional star
White Tiger of the West (西方白虎)	奎	Kuí	Legs	奎	Kuí	Legs	78 Psc		奎宿增十四	Kuísùzēngshísì	14th additional star
White Tiger of the West (西方白虎)	奎	Kuí	Legs	外屏	Wàipíng	Outer Fence					
White Tiger of the West (西方白虎)	奎	Kuí	Legs	外屏	Wàipíng	Outer Fence	δ Psc	Waiping	外屏一	Wàipíngyī	1st star
White Tiger of the West (西方白虎)	奎	Kuí	Legs	外屏	Wàipíng	Outer Fence	ε Psc		外屏二	Wàipíngèr	2nd star
White Tiger of the West (西方白虎)	奎	Kuí	Legs	外屏	Wàipíng	Outer Fence	ζ Psc	Revati (for component Aa), Paushna (for component Ba)	外屏三	Wàipíngsān	3rd star
White Tiger of the West (西方白虎)	奎	Kuí	Legs	外屏	Wàipíng	Outer Fence	μ Psc		外屏四	Wàipíngsì	4th star
White Tiger of the West (西方白虎)	奎	Kuí	Legs	外屏	Wàipíng	Outer Fence	ν Psc		外屏五	Wàipíngwu	5th star
White Tiger of the West (西方白虎)	奎	Kuí	Legs	外屏	Wàipíng	Outer Fence	ξ Psc		外屏六	Wàipíngliù	6th star
White Tiger of the West (西方白虎)	奎	Kuí	Legs	外屏	Wàipíng	Outer Fence	α Psc	Alrescha (for component A)	外屏七	Wàipíngqī	7th star
White Tiger of the West (西方白虎)	奎	Kuí	Legs	外屏	Wàipíng	Outer Fence	72 Psc		外屏增一	Wàipíngzēngyī	1st additional star
White Tiger of the West (西方白虎)	奎	Kuí	Legs	外屏	Wàipíng	Outer Fence	75 Psc		外屏增二	Wàipíngzēngèr	2nd additional star
White Tiger of the West (西方白虎)	奎	Kuí	Legs	外屏	Wàipíng	Outer Fence	88 Psc	Buranun	外屏增三	Wàipíngzēngsān	3rd additional star
White Tiger of the West (西方白虎)	奎	Kuí	Legs	外屏	Wàipíng	Outer Fence	80 Psc		外屏增四	Wàipíngzēngsì	4th additional star
White Tiger of the West (西方白虎)	奎	Kuí	Legs	外屏	Wàipíng	Outer Fence	77 Psc		外屏增五	Wàipíngzēngwu	5th additional star
White Tiger of the West (西方白虎)	奎	Kuí	Legs	外屏	Wàipíng	Outer Fence	73 Psc		外屏增六	Wàipíngzēngliù	6th additional star
White Tiger of the West (西方白虎)	奎	Kuí	Legs	外屏	Wàipíng	Outer Fence	70 Psc		外屏增七	Wàipíngzēngqī	7th additional star
White Tiger of the West (西方白虎)	奎	Kuí	Legs	外屏	Wàipíng	Outer Fence	62 Psc		外屏增八	Wàipíngzēngbā	8th additional star
White Tiger of the West (西方白虎)	奎	Kuí	Legs	外屏	Wàipíng	Outer Fence	60 Psc		外屏增九	Wàipíngzēngjiǔ	9th additional star
White Tiger of the West (西方白虎)	奎	Kuí	Legs	外屏	Wàipíng	Outer Fence	89 Psc		外屏增十四	Wàipíngzēngshísì	14th additional star
White Tiger of the West (西方白虎)	奎	Kuí	Legs	外屏	Wàipíng	Outer Fence	112 Psc	Zibbatu	外屏增十五	Wàipíngzēngshíwu	15th additional star
White Tiger of the West (西方白虎)	婁	Lóu	Bond	婁	Lóu	Bond					
White Tiger of the West (西方白虎)	婁	Lóu	Bond	婁	Lóu	Bond	3 Ari		婁宿增二	Lóusùzēngèr	2nd additional star
White Tiger of the West (西方白虎)	婁	Lóu	Bond	婁	Lóu	Bond	107 Psc		婁宿增三	Lóusùzēngsān	3rd additional star
White Tiger of the West (西方白虎)	婁	Lóu	Bond	右更	Yòugēng	Official in Charge of the Pasturing					
White Tiger of the West (西方白虎)	婁	Lóu	Bond	右更	Yòugēng	Official in Charge of the Pasturing	ρ Psc		右更一	Yòugēngyī	1st star
White Tiger of the West (西方白虎)	婁	Lóu	Bond	右更	Yòugēng	Official in Charge of the Pasturing	η Psc	Alpherg (for component A)	右更二	Yòugēngèr	2nd star
White Tiger of the West (西方白虎)	婁	Lóu	Bond	右更	Yòugēng	Official in Charge of the Pasturing	π Psc	Idigna	右更三	Yòugēngsān	3rd star
White Tiger of the West (西方白虎)	婁	Lóu	Bond	右更	Yòugēng	Official in Charge of the Pasturing	ο Psc	Torcular (for component A)	右更四	Yòugēngsì	4th star
White Tiger of the West (西方白虎)	婁	Lóu	Bond	右更	Yòugēng	Official in Charge of the Pasturing	104 Psc		右更五	Yòugēngwu	5th star
White Tiger of the West (西方白虎)	婁	Lóu	Bond	右更	Yòugēng	Official in Charge of the Pasturing	94 Psc		右更增一	Yòugēngzēngyī	1st additional star
White Tiger of the West (西方白虎)	婁	Lóu	Bond	右更	Yòugēng	Official in Charge of the Pasturing	101 Psc		右更增二	Yòugēngzēngèr	2nd additional star
White Tiger of the West (西方白虎)	婁	Lóu	Bond	右更	Yòugēng	Official in Charge of the Pasturing	100 Psc		右更增四	Yòugēngzēngsì	4th additional star
White Tiger of the West (西方白虎)	婁	Lóu	Bond	右更	Yòugēng	Official in Charge of the Pasturing	HD 8356		右更增五	Yòugēngzēngwǔ	5th additional star

== See also ==
- Chinese astronomy
- Traditional Chinese star names
- Chinese constellations
