= Psi Piscium =

The Bayer designation Psi Piscium (ψ Psc, ψ Piscium) is shared by three star systems in the constellation Pisces:

- Psi¹ Piscium (74 Piscium)
- Psi² Piscium (79 Piscium)
- Psi³ Piscium (81 Piscium)
