= List of stars in Pisces =

This is the list of notable stars in the constellation Pisces, sorted by decreasing brightness.

Name	B	F	G.	Var	HD	HIP	RA	Dec	vis. mag.	abs. mag.	Dist. (ly)	Sp. class	Notes
η Psc	η	99			9270	7097	01^{h} 31^{m} 28.99^{s}	+15° 20′ 45.0″	3.62	−1.16	294	G8III	Alpherg, Kullat Nunu; γ Cassiopeiae variable V_{max} = 3.59 ^{m}, V_{min} = 3.65^{m}
γ Psc	γ	6	21		219615	114971	23^{h} 17^{m} 09.49^{s}	+03° 16′ 56.1″	3.70	0.68	131	G7III	Yunyu
ω Psc	ω	28	56		224617	118268	23^{h} 59^{m} 18.60^{s}	+06° 51′ 48.9″	4.03	1.47	106	F4IV	Pili, Dzaneb al Samkat, Cauda Piscis
ι Psc	ι	17	39		222368	116771	23^{h} 39^{m} 56.82^{s}	+05° 37′ 38.5″	4.13	3.43	45	F7V	Puwuh Atarung
ο Psc	ο	110	127		10761	8198	01^{h} 45^{m} 23.59^{s}	+09° 09′ 27.5″	4.26	−0.23	258	K0III	Torcular, Torcularis Septentrionalis
ε Psc	ε	71	103		6186	4906	01^{h} 02^{m} 56.66^{s}	+07° 53′ 24.3″	4.27	0.44	190	K0III	
θ Psc	θ	10	29		220954	115830	23^{h} 27^{m} 58.17^{s}	+06° 22′ 44.8″	4.27	0.83	159	K1III	
α Psc A	α	113			12446	9487	02^{h} 02^{m} 02.80^{s}	+02° 45′ 49.5″	4.33		139	A0p	Alrescha, Al Rescha, Alrischa, Alrisha, Rescha, El Rischa, Al Richa, Kaitain, Okda; α² CVn variable
30 Psc		30	59	YY	224935	154	00^{h} 01^{m} 57.59^{s}	−06° 00′ 50.3″	4.37	−1.15	415	M3III	YY Psc
δ Psc	δ	63	97		4656	3786	00^{h} 48^{m} 40.90^{s}	+07° 35′ 06.7″	4.44	−0.42	305	K5III	Waiping
ν Psc	ν	106	125		10380	7884	01^{h} 41^{m} 25.91^{s}	+05° 29′ 15.4″	4.45	−0.81	368	K3III	
β Psc	β	4	14		217891	113889	23^{h} 03^{m} 52.61^{s}	+03° 49′ 12.3″	4.48	−1.42	492	B6Ve	Fumalsamakah, Fum al Samakah
λ Psc	λ	18	41		222603	116928	23^{h} 42^{m} 02.88^{s}	+01° 46′ 49.5″	4.49	2.04	101	A7V	
τ Psc	τ	83			7106	5586	01^{h} 11^{m} 39.59^{s}	+30° 05′ 23.0″	4.51	1.03	162	K0III-IV...	
33 Psc		33	63	BC	28	443	00^{h} 05^{m} 20.15^{s}	−05° 42′ 28.2″	4.61	1.63	128	K1III	BC Psc; RS CVn variable
ξ Psc	ξ	111	132		11559	8833	01^{h} 53^{m} 33.34^{s}	+03° 11′ 14.9″	4.61	0.78	191	K0III SB	
χ Psc	χ	84			7087	5571	01^{h} 11^{m} 27.19^{s}	+21° 02′ 04.8″	4.66	−0.99	439	K0III	
φ Psc	φ	85			7318	5742	01^{h} 13^{m} 44.94^{s}	+24° 35′ 01.6″	4.67	−0.65	377	K0III...	
υ Psc	υ	90			7964	6193	01^{h} 19^{m} 27.98^{s}	+27° 15′ 50.7″	4.74	−0.16	311	A3V	
μ Psc	μ	98	120		9138	7007	01^{h} 30^{m} 10.94^{s}	+06° 08′ 38.2″	4.84	−0.38	360	K4III	
27 Psc		27	55		224533	118209	23^{h} 58^{m} 40.41^{s}	−03° 33′ 20.9″	4.88	0.70	224	G9III	
κ Psc	κ	8	27		220825	115738	23^{h} 26^{m} 55.91^{s}	+01° 15′ 21.0″	4.95	1.47	162	A0p	α² CVn variable
19 Psc		19	42	TX	223075	117245	23^{h} 46^{m} 23.54^{s}	+03° 29′ 12.7″	4.95	−1.89	760	C5II	TX Psc; carbon star
47 Psc		47		TV	2411	2219	00^{h} 28^{m} 02.84^{s}	+17° 53′ 35.1″	5.01	−0.88	490	M3IIIvar	TV Psc; semiregular variable
7 Psc	b	7	22		220009	115227	23^{h} 20^{m} 20.54^{s}	+05° 22′ 53.2″	5.05	−0.05	341	K2III	
64 Psc		64			4676	3810	00^{h} 48^{m} 58.71^{s}	+16° 56′ 28.1″	5.07	3.18	78	F8V...	
29 Psc		29	58		224926	145	00^{h} 01^{m} 49.44^{s}	−03° 01′ 38.9″	5.13	−0.36	409	B7III-IV	
89 Psc	f	89	115		7804	6061	01^{h} 17^{m} 47.98^{s}	+03° 36′ 52.3″	5.13	0.99	220	A3V	
82 Psc	g	82			7034	5544	01^{h} 11^{m} 06.77^{s}	+31° 25′ 29.2″	5.15	−1.03	560	F0V	
ζ Psc A	ζ	86			7344	5737	01^{h} 13^{m} 43.80^{s}	+07° 34′ 31.8″	5.21	1.93	148	A7IV	Revati of Vedic astrology
α Psc B	α	113	137		12447		02^{h} 02^{m} 02.80^{s}	+02° 45′ 49.0″	5.23			A3m	
91 Psc	l	91			8126	6315	01^{h} 21^{m} 07.35^{s}	+28° 44′ 18.2″	5.23	0.12	344	K5III	
107 Psc		107			10476	7981	01^{h} 42^{m} 29.95^{s}	+20° 16′ 12.5″	5.24	5.87	24	K1V	nearby
ψ¹ Psc A	ψ¹	74			6456	5131	01^{h} 05^{m} 40.93^{s}	+21° 28′ 23.6″	5.33	1.01	238	A1Vn	
ρ Psc	ρ	93			8723	6706	01^{h} 26^{m} 15.28^{s}	+19° 10′ 20.4″	5.35	3.27	85	F2V:var	
57 Psc		57		EL	4408	3632	00^{h} 46^{m} 32.98^{s}	+15° 28′ 32.2″	5.36	−0.92	587	M4III	EL Psc
41 Psc	d	41	81		1635	1645	00^{h} 20^{m} 35.86^{s}	+08° 11′ 24.9″	5.38	−0.04	395	K3III	Simmakh
52 Psc		52			2910	2568	00^{h} 32^{m} 35.40^{s}	+20° 17′ 40.0″	5.38	0.90	257	K0III	
5 Psc	A	5	17		218527	114273	23^{h} 08^{m} 40.84^{s}	+02° 07′ 39.4″	5.42	0.75	280	G8IV	
2 Psc		2	9		217264	113521	22^{h} 59^{m} 27.40^{s}	+00° 57′ 47.1″	5.43	0.76	280	K1III:	
55 Psc		55			3690	3138	00^{h} 39^{m} 55.57^{s}	+21° 26′ 18.6″	5.43	−0.14	433	K2IIIa	
68 Psc	h	68			5575	4510	00^{h} 57^{m} 50.15^{s}	+28° 59′ 32.0″	5.44	−1.23	704	G6III	
20 Psc		20	43		223252	117375	23^{h} 47^{m} 56.49^{s}	−02° 45′ 41.8″	5.49	0.73	291	G8III	
σ Psc	σ	69			6118	4889	01^{h} 02^{m} 49.09^{s}	+31° 48′ 15.6″	5.50	−0.02	414	B9.5V	
94 Psc		94			8763	6732	01^{h} 26^{m} 41.65^{s}	+19° 14′ 26.0″	5.50	0.63	307	K1III	
58 Psc		58			4482	3675	00^{h} 47^{m} 01.43^{s}	+11° 58′ 26.2″	5.51	0.99	262	G8II	
80 Psc	e	80	109		6763	5346	01^{h} 08^{m} 22.34^{s}	+05° 39′ 00.8″	5.51	2.73	117	F0III-IV	
34 Psc		34			560	813	00^{h} 10^{m} 02.18^{s}	+11° 08′ 44.9″	5.54	0.55	325	B9V	
π Psc	π	102			9919	7535	01^{h} 37^{m} 05.96^{s}	+12° 08′ 29.4″	5.54	2.89	110	F0V	Idigna
ψ¹ Psc B	ψ¹	74			6457	5132	01^{h} 05^{m} 41.68^{s}	+21° 27′ 55.7″	5.55	1.38	222	A0Vn	
ψ² Psc	ψ²	79			6695	5310	01^{h} 07^{m} 57.11^{s}	+20° 44′ 21.6″	5.56	2.09	161	A3V	
ψ³ Psc	ψ³	81			6903	5454	01^{h} 09^{m} 49.20^{s}	+19° 39′ 30.2″	5.57	0.11	403	G0III	
22 Psc		22	49		223719	117683	23^{h} 51^{m} 57.83^{s}	+02° 55′ 49.5″	5.59	−2.21	1181	K4II	
72 Psc		72			6397	5081	01^{h} 05^{m} 05.35^{s}	+14° 56′ 45.6″	5.64	1.95	178	F4II-III	
16 Psc		16	38		221950	116495	23^{h} 36^{m} 23.35^{s}	+02° 06′ 07.5″	5.68	3.22	101	F6Vbwvar	
51 Psc		51	90		2913	2548	00^{h} 32^{m} 23.75^{s}	+06° 57′ 19.6″	5.69	1.15	264	B9.5V	
32 Psc	c	32	61		225003	194	00^{h} 02^{m} 29.76^{s}	+08° 29′ 08.1″	5.70	2.82	123	F0V	On 1 April 2009, it was occulted by Venus as viewed from the South Pacific, although Venus may not have been visible.
HD 4628			96		4628	3765	00^{h} 48^{m} 22.53^{s}	+05° 17′ 00.2″	5.74	6.38	24	K2V	nearby
44 Psc		44	85		2114	2006	00^{h} 25^{m} 24.22^{s}	+01° 56′ 23.0″	5.77	−0.53	593	G5III	
21 Psc		21	46		223438	117491	23^{h} 49^{m} 27.48^{s}	+01° 04′ 34.3″	5.77	1.20	267	A5m	
XZ Psc			52	XZ	224062	117887	23^{h} 54^{m} 46.65^{s}	+00° 06′ 33.6″	5.78	−0.69	643	M5IIb	
66 Psc		66			5267	4267	00^{h} 54^{m} 35.22^{s}	+19° 11′ 18.4″	5.80	0.54	367	A1Vn	
					6953	5494	01^{h} 10^{m} 19.45^{s}	+25° 27′ 28.9″	5.81	0.60	360	K5III	
67 G. Psc			67		587	840	00^{h} 10^{m} 18.85^{s}	−05° 14′ 54.7″	5.84	2.14	179	K1III	
11 G. Psc			11		217459	113622	23^{h} 00^{m} 42.90^{s}	+03° 00′ 43.2″	5.85	−0.27	547	K4III	
54 Psc		54			3651	3093	00^{h} 39^{m} 21.0^{s}	+21° 15′ 01″	5.8	5.65	36	K0V	has a planet (b)
53 Psc		53		AG	3379	2903	00^{h} 36^{m} 47.31^{s}	+15° 13′ 54.3″	5.89	−1.21	856	B2.5IV	AG Psc; β Cep variable
112 Psc		112	135		12235	9353	02^{h} 00^{m} 09.02^{s}	+03° 05′ 51.5″	5.89	3.43	101	G2IV	Zibbatu
40 G. Psc			40		222602	116918	23^{h} 41^{m} 56.71^{s}	+07° 15′ 02.3″	5.89	0.81	338	A3Vn	
					9640	7359	01^{h} 34^{m} 49.05^{s}	+18° 27′ 38.4″	5.90	−0.41	597	M2III	
131 G. Psc			131		11037	8404	01^{h} 48^{m} 26.02^{s}	+03° 41′ 07.5″	5.91	0.90	328	G9III	
14 Psc		14	35		221675	116323	23^{h} 34^{m} 08.95^{s}	−01° 14′ 51.1″	5.91	1.67	230	A2m	
62 Psc		62	95		4627	3760	00^{h} 48^{m} 17.34^{s}	+07° 17′ 59.7″	5.92	−0.62	661	G8III	
24 Psc		24	50		223825	117761	23^{h} 52^{m} 55.52^{s}	−03° 09′ 19.4″	5.93	0.00	499	G9III	
					9780	7447	01^{h} 35^{m} 54.67^{s}	+17° 26′ 01.6″	5.95	2.07	195	F0IV	
87 Psc		87			7374	5778	01^{h} 14^{m} 07.65^{s}	+16° 08′ 00.8″	5.97	0.04	500	B8III	
					8388	6492	01^{h} 23^{m} 24.95^{s}	+20° 28′ 08.4″	5.97	−1.05	827	K5	
60 Psc		60	94		4526	3697	00^{h} 47^{m} 23.62^{s}	+06° 44′ 27.5″	5.98	0.25	455	G8III	
105 Psc		105			10164	7740	01^{h} 39^{m} 40.77^{s}	+16° 24′ 21.2″	5.98	0.26	454	K2III	
97 Psc		97		VX	9100	6981	01^{h} 29^{m} 52.83^{s}	+18° 21′ 20.4″	6.01	0.69	379	A4IV	VX Psc; δ Sct variable
35 Psc		35	70		1061	1196	00^{h} 14^{m} 58.78^{s}	+08° 49′ 15.7″	6.02	1.50	261	F0IV	UU Psc; Algol variable
73 Psc		73	105		6386	5074	01^{h} 04^{m} 52.62^{s}	+05° 39′ 22.7″	6.03	−0.69	721	K5III	
88 Psc		88	114		7446	5824	01^{h} 14^{m} 42.40^{s}	+06° 59′ 42.7″	6.04	0.29	461	G6III:	Buranun
					7578	5936	01^{h} 16^{m} 18.90^{s}	+33° 06′ 53.3″	6.04	1.12	315	K1III	
48 Psc		48			2436	2224	00^{h} 28^{m} 12.69^{s}	+16° 26′ 42.4″	6.05	−1.62	1113	K5III	
88 G. Psc			88		2454	2235	00^{h} 28^{m} 20.05^{s}	+10° 11′ 23.5″	6.04	3.24	119	F5V Sr	Barium dwarf
					1419	1465	00^{h} 18^{m} 17.27^{s}	+11° 12′ 22.6″	6.07	0.38	448	K0III	
					6966	5483	01^{h} 10^{m} 11.43^{s}	+15° 40′ 26.3″	6.07	−0.09	557	M0III	
84 G. Psc			84		2023	1939	00^{h} 24^{m} 29.67^{s}	−02° 13′ 08.3″	6.08	−0.02	541	K1III	
67 Psc	k	67			5382	4366	00^{h} 55^{m} 58.52^{s}	+27° 12′ 33.7″	6.08	1.47	273	A5IV	
59 Psc		59		XX	4490	3685	00^{h} 47^{m} 13.56^{s}	+19° 34′ 43.3″	6.11	0.96	349	F0Vn	XX Psc; δ Sct variable
1 Psc		1	3		216701	113167	22^{h} 54^{m} 59.47^{s}	+01° 03′ 53.6″	6.11	1.24	307	A7III	
36 Psc		36	73		1227	1319	00^{h} 16^{m} 34.06^{s}	+08° 14′ 24.7″	6.12	0.46	442	G8II-III	
WW Psc			100	WW	5820	4655	00^{h} 59^{m} 49.67^{s}	+06° 28′ 59.7″	6.14	−1.42	1062	M2III	
75 Psc		75			6557	5204	01^{h} 06^{m} 33.62^{s}	+12° 57′ 21.5″	6.14	0.89	366	G8III	
HD 217107			6		217107	113421	22^{h} 58^{m} 15.54^{s}	−02° 23′ 43.2″	6.17	4.70	64	G8IV	has two planets (b & c)
5 Cet		(5)	66	AP	352	664	00^{h} 08^{m} 12.09^{s}	−02° 26′ 51.7″	6.18	−1.26	1003	K2III	AP Psc; β Lyr variable
					8634	6669	01^{h} 25^{m} 35.66^{s}	+23° 30′ 41.7″	6.18	1.75	251	F5III	
76 G. Psc			76		1367	1421	00^{h} 17^{m} 47.65^{s}	+01° 41′ 19.3″	6.19	1.17	330	K0II	
					5316	4317	00^{h} 55^{m} 14.66^{s}	+24° 33′ 25.5″	6.19	−0.05	578	M4III	
					6301	5034	01^{h} 04^{m} 27.57^{s}	+29° 39′ 32.8″	6.20	3.08	137	F7IV-V	
					10308	7874	01^{h} 41^{m} 18.30^{s}	+25° 44′ 44.9″	6.20	2.46	183	F2III	
118 G. Psc			118		8949	6868	01^{h} 28^{m} 22.85^{s}	+07° 57′ 40.9″	6.22	0.96	367	K1IIIvar	variable
3 Psc		3	10		217428	113610	23^{h} 00^{m} 37.88^{s}	+00° 11′ 09.0″	6.22	−0.24	639	G4III	
26 Psc		26	53		224103	117927	23^{h} 55^{m} 07.78^{s}	+07° 04′ 15.7″	6.22	0.76	403	B9V	
78 Psc		78			6680	5319	01^{h} 08^{m} 01.20^{s}	+32° 00′ 43.9″	6.23	3.12	137	F5IV	
101 Psc		101			9766	7436	01^{h} 35^{m} 46.44^{s}	+14° 39′ 41.2″	6.23	−3.01	2296	B9.5III	
					7229	5679	01^{h} 12^{m} 59.47^{s}	+30° 03′ 51.2″	6.23	1.15	383	G9III	
42 Psc		42			1796	1772	00^{h} 22^{m} 25.45^{s}	+13° 28′ 56.8″	6.25	0.13	545	K3III	
9 Psc		9	28		220858	115768	23^{h} 27^{m} 14.77^{s}	+01° 07′ 21.7″	6.26	0.78	407	G7III	
109 Psc		109			10697	8159	01^{h} 44^{m} 55.85^{s}	+20° 05′ 00.3″	6.27	3.71	106	G5IV	has a planet (b)
WZ Psc			140	WZ	12872	9809	02^{h} 06^{m} 12.27^{s}	+08° 14′ 53.3″	6.27	−0.88	879	M4 or M2III	
76 Psc		76			6476	5175	01^{h} 06^{m} 11.20^{s}	+32° 10′ 53.6″	6.28	0.02	582	K0	
5 G. Psc			5		217019	113360	22^{h} 57^{m} 32.76^{s}	+03° 48′ 36.6″	6.28	0.53	460	K1III	
25 Psc		25	51		223855	117774	23^{h} 53^{m} 04.75^{s}	+02° 05′ 26.3″	6.29	0.53	462	A1V	
					5612	4520	00^{h} 57^{m} 54.52^{s}	+13° 41′ 45.2″	6.30	0.28	522	G8III	
121 G. Psc			121		9496	7243	01^{h} 33^{m} 18.27^{s}	+08° 12′ 31.7″	6.31	0.04	584	K0	
HD 6			62		6	417	00^{h} 05^{m} 03.80^{s}	−00° 30′ 10.5″	6.32	0.53	469	G9III:	
					3268	2832	00^{h} 35^{m} 54.88^{s}	+13° 12′ 27.0″	6.32	3.44	123	F7V	
31 Psc		31	60		224995	186	00^{h} 02^{m} 24.17^{s}	+08° 57′ 24.6″	6.33	0.72	432	A6V	
DT Psc				DT	7351	5772	01^{h} 14^{m} 04.87^{s}	+28° 31′ 46.9″	6.33	−1.14	1016	M2S SB	semiregular variable
24 G. Psc			24		220406	115476	23^{h} 23^{m} 31.90^{s}	+00° 17′ 28.7″	6.33	−1.89	1436	K2 or K4III	
124 G. Psc			124		10262	7819	01^{h} 40^{m} 34.89^{s}	+08° 45′ 38.8″	6.34	2.62	181	F2	
77 Psc A		77	106		6479	5141	01^{h} 05^{m} 49.22^{s}	+04° 54′ 31.2″	6.35	3.05	149	F3V	binary star
8 G. Psc			8		217186	113465	22^{h} 58^{m} 42.64^{s}	+07° 20′ 24.9″	6.35	1.44	313	A1V	
30 G. Psc			30		221147	115945	23^{h} 29^{m} 27.00^{s}	−01° 47′ 28.2″	6.35	−0.91	924	K0III	11 Piscium
					7724	6025	01^{h} 17^{m} 24.14^{s}	+31° 44′ 40.6″	6.36	1.72	277	K0	
7 G. Psc			7		217131	113433	22^{h} 58^{m} 23.61^{s}	−01° 24′ 36.7″	6.38	1.44	317	F0V	
					3166	2734	00^{h} 34^{m} 55.41^{s}	+13° 22′ 16.6″	6.39	0.95	400	K0	
98 G. Psc			98		4928	3992	00^{h} 51^{m} 18.31^{s}	+03° 23′ 06.6″	6.39	0.70	448	K0III	
CY Psc			123	CY	9889	7505	01^{h} 36^{m} 43.52^{s}	+07° 49′ 53.4″	6.39	−0.83	906	M0	
16 G. Psc			16		218103	114005	23^{h} 05^{m} 17.61^{s}	+01° 18′ 25.8″	6.39	0.90	409	G9III	
13 Psc		13	32		221409	116146	23^{h} 31^{m} 57.56^{s}	−01° 05′ 09.3″	6.39	−0.56	801	K1III	
46 Psc		46			2410	2213	00^{h} 27^{m} 58.48^{s}	+19° 30′ 50.7″	6.40	0.33	533	K0	
15 G. Psc			15		217926	113904	23^{h} 04^{m} 00.80^{s}	+06° 36′ 58.8″	6.42	1.82	271	F2V	
4 Cet		(4)	65		315	635	00^{h} 07^{m} 44.10^{s}	−02° 32′ 55.3″	6.43	0.56	487	B8IIIsp...	variable
92 G. Psc			92		3457	2954	00^{h} 37^{m} 30.44^{s}	+03° 08′ 07.8″	6.43	0.19	577	K4III	
					2358	2178	00^{h} 27^{m} 31.02^{s}	+16° 01′ 31.7″	6.44	0.87	423	A5	
ζ Psc B	ζ	86	113		7345	5743	01^{h} 13^{m} 45.17^{s}	+07° 34′ 42.2″	6.44	2.55	195	F7V	
					8733	6714	01^{h} 26^{m} 23.56^{s}	+20° 04′ 15.2″	6.44	1.59	304	K0	
138 G. Psc			138		12730	9706	02^{h} 04^{m} 50.99^{s}	+07° 44′ 08.4″	6.44	0.60	479	K0	
13 G. Psc			13		217590	113705	23^{h} 01^{m} 43.56^{s}	+03° 31′ 51.7″	6.44	0.22	571	G5	
					5418	4382	00^{h} 56^{m} 09.12^{s}	+13° 57′ 07.1″	6.46	0.53	501	G8II	
					5641	4558	00^{h} 58^{m} 18.90^{s}	+21° 24′ 16.2″	6.47	0.88	428	A2V	
15 Psc		15	37		221833	116422	23^{h} 35^{m} 28.61^{s}	+01° 18′ 47.5″	6.47	1.58	310	K0	
45 G. Psc			45		223346	117445	23^{h} 48^{m} 49.36^{s}	+02° 12′ 52.2″	6.47	2.76	180	F5III-IV	
43 Psc		43			2035	1948	00^{h} 24^{m} 38.15^{s}	+14° 18′ 55.9″	6.48	0.40	535	K0	
112 G. Psc			112		7107	5575	01^{h} 11^{m} 28.97^{s}	+10° 17′ 30.9″	6.49	0.98	412	G5	
61 Psc		61			4568	3730	00^{h} 47^{m} 54.73^{s}	+20° 55′ 31.1″	6.51	2.71	187	F8V	
HR 515		(3)		VY	10845	8271	01^{h} 46^{m} 35.27^{s}	+17° 24′ 45.7″	6.55	−0.13	707	A9III	3 Arietis; δ Sct variable
40 Psc		40			1563	1595	00^{h} 19^{m} 56.28^{s}	+16° 15′ 03.2″	6.60	0.45	553	K0	
38 Psc		38	75		1317	1392	00^{h} 17^{m} 24.50^{s}	+08° 52′ 34.8″	6.66	2.58	213	F5	
104 Psc		104			10135	7710	01^{h} 39^{m} 15.39^{s}	+14° 17′ 08.3″	6.74	1.07	444	K0	
45 Psc		45	86		2140	2025	00^{h} 25^{m} 41.89^{s}	+07° 41′ 28.4″	6.77	−0.62	979	K0	
65 Psc	i	65			4757	3885	00^{h} 49^{m} 53.11^{s}	+27° 42′ 37.1″	7.0		347	F4III	forms a binary with HD 4758
95 Psc		95			8875	6815	01^{h} 27^{m} 39.81^{s}	+05° 21′ 11.2″	7.01	2.75	232	G0V	
65 Psc	i	65			4758	3885	00^{h} 49^{m} 53.20^{s}	+27° 42′ 37.0″	7.1			F5III	forms a binary with HD 4757
HD 8574					8574	6643	01^{h} 25^{m} 12.52^{s}	+28° 34′ 00.1″	7.11	3.89	144	F8	Bélénos, has a planet (b)
77 Psc B		77			6480	5144	01^{h} 05^{m} 51.42^{s}	+04° 54′ 35.0″	7.26	4.04	144	F6V	component of the 77 Psc system
100 Psc		100			9656	7364	01^{h} 34^{m} 51.61^{s}	+12° 33′ 31.2″	7.28	2.68	272	A3V	
HD 217786					217786	113834	23^{h} 03^{m} 08^{s}	−00° 25′ 47″	7.80		179	F8V	has a planet (b)
HD 4313					4313	3574	00^{h} 45^{m} 40.36^{s}	+07° 50′ 42.1″	7.82	2.23	429	K2IV	has a planet (b)
HD 12484					12484	9519	02^{h} 02^{m} 27.0^{s}	+02° 48′ 57″	8.17		167	F8	has a planet (b)
HD 5891					5891	4715	01^{h} 00^{m} 33^{s}	+20° 17′ 33″	8.25		819	G5	has a planet (b)
HD 1502					1502	1547	00^{h} 19^{m} 17^{s}	+14° 03′ 17″	8.52		519	K0	Citadelle, has a planet (b)
HD 218566					218566	114322	23^{h} 09^{m} 11^{s}	−02° 15′ 39″	8.63		98	K3V	Ebla, has a planet (b)
HD 4203					4203	3502	00^{h} 44^{m} 41.20^{s}	+20° 26′ 56.1″	8.68		250	G5	has two planets (b & c)
HD 3167					3167	2736	00^{h} 34^{m} 57.5^{s}	+04° 22′ 53″	8.94		149	G	has three planets (b, c & d)
HD 224690					224690	2	00^{h} 00^{m} 01.0^{s}	−19° 29′ 55.8″	9.23		157	K3V	
WASP-76							01^{h} 46^{m} 32.0^{s}	+02° 42′ 02″	9.5		391	F7	has a transiting planet (b)
WASP-181							01^{h} 47^{m} 10.0^{s}	+03° 07′ 59″	10.0		1445	G2	has a transiting planet (b)
WASP-118							01^{h} 18^{m} 12.0^{s}	+02° 42′ 10″	11.02		815	F6	has a transiting planet (b)
WASP-32							00^{h} 15^{m} 51^{s}	+01° 12′ 02″	11.3			G	Parumleo, has a transiting planet (b)
WASP-28							23^{h} 34^{m} 27.88^{s}	−01° 34′ 48.1″	12.0	4.4	1090	F8-G0	has a transiting planet (b)
Van Maanen's star						3829	00^{h} 49^{m} 09.90^{s}	+05° 23′ 19.0″	12.36	14.14	14	DG...	31st-closest star system; the nearest single white dwarf
WASP-151							23^{h} 16^{m} 15.2^{s}	+00° 18′ 24″	12.9		1566	G1	has a transiting planet (b)
HAT-P-51							01^{h} 24^{m} 16.0^{s}	+32° 48′ 39″	13.44		1533		has a transiting planet (b)
Table legend: • Name = Proper name • B = Bayer designation • F or/and G. = Flamsteed designation or Gould designation • Var = Variable-star designation • HD = Henry Draper Catalogue designation number • HIP = Hipparcos Catalogue designation number • RA = Right ascension for the Epoch/Equinox J2000.0 • Dec = Declination for the Epoch/Equinox J2000.0 • vis. mag. = visual magnitude (m or m_{v}), also known as apparent magnitude • abs. mag. = absolute magnitude (M_{v}) • Dist. (ly) = Distance in light-years from Earth • Sp. class = Spectral class of the star in the stellar classification system • Notes = Common name(s) or alternate name(s); comments; notable properties [for example: multiple star status, range of variability if it is a variable star, exoplanets, etc.]

== See also ==
- List of stars by constellation
