= Pi Andromedae =

Binary star system in the constellation Andromeda

- Location of π Andromedae (circled)

Observation data Epoch J2000 Equinox ICRS
- Constellation: Andromeda
- Right ascension: 00^{h} 36^{m} 52.85132^{s}
- Declination: +33° 43′ 09.6363″
- Apparent magnitude (V): 4.36 (4.9/5.3)

Characteristics
- Spectral type: B5 V (B5 V + B5 V)
- U−B color index: −0.55
- B−V color index: −0.16

Astrometry
| Radial velocity (R_{v}) | +8.7 km/s |
| Proper motion (μ) | RA: 14.669(118) mas/yr Dec.: −3.385(93) mas/yr |
| Parallax (π) | 5.6563±0.1474 mas |
| Distance | 580 ± 20 ly (177 ± 5 pc) |

Orbit
| Period (P) | 143.53±0.06 d |
| Semi-major axis (a) | 6.69±0.05 mas |
| Eccentricity (e) | 0.542±0.006 |
| Inclination (i) | 103.0±0.2° |
| Longitude of the node (Ω) | 94.7±0.2° |
| Periastron epoch (T) | 7717.7±0.4 |
| Argument of periastron (ω) (secondary) | 170.7±0.7° |
| Semi-amplitude (K_{1}) (primary) | 47.50±0.53 km/s |
| Semi-amplitude (K_{2}) (secondary) | 117.4±2.8 km/s |

Details

A
| Mass | 5.8 M_{☉} |
| Radius | 4.7 R_{☉} |
| Luminosity | 1,000 L_{☉} |
| Surface gravity (log g) | 4.10 cgs |
| Temperature | 15,000 K |
| Metallicity [Fe/H] | –0.20 dex |
| Rotational velocity (v sin i) | 25 km/s |
| Age | 80 Myr |

B
| Mass | 4.8 M_{☉} |
| Radius | 4.7 R_{☉} |
| Luminosity | 1,000 L_{☉} |
| Temperature | 15,000 K |

Other designations
- Pi And, π Andromedae, π And, 29 Andromedae, BD+32°101, FK5 18, HD 3369, HIP 2912, HR 154, SAO 54033, PPM 65480, ADS 513

Database references
| SIMBAD | data |

Pi Andromedae is a binary star system in the northern constellation of Andromeda. Its Bayer designation is latinized from π Andromedae, and abbreviated Pi And or π And, respectively. With an apparent visual magnitude of 4.4, it is visible to the naked eye. Based on parallax measurements, it is located at a distance of approximately 580 light-years (180 parsecs) from Earth.

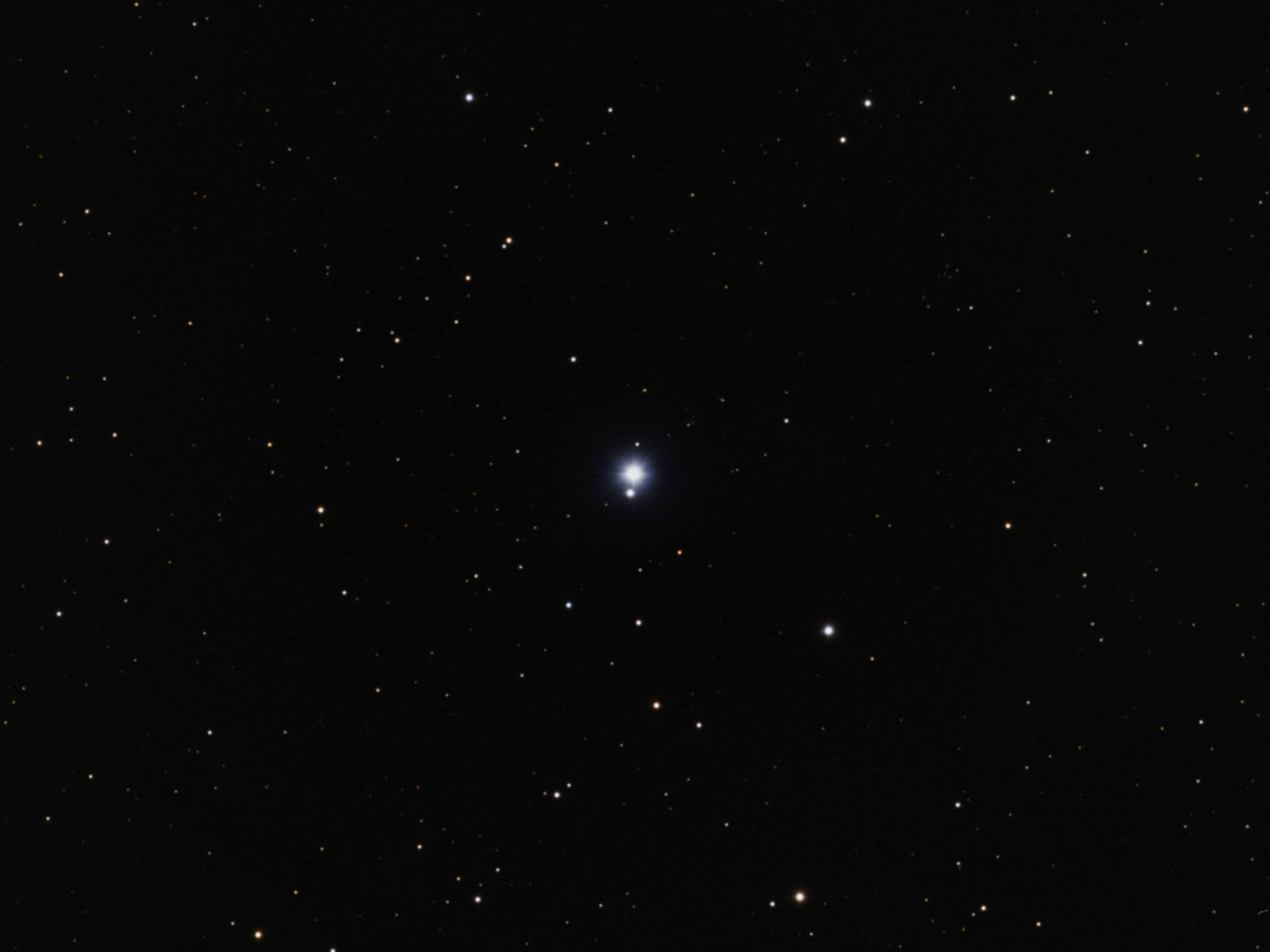
π Andromedae in optical light

The pair is classified as a blue-white B-type main sequence dwarf, with an apparent magnitude of +4.34. It is a spectroscopic binary with an orbital period of 143.5 days and an eccentricity of 0.54.

The spectroscopic binary forms a triple system with BD+32 102, a magnitude 8.6 star located 35.9 arcseconds away. At 55 arcseconds separation is an 11th magnitude companion that is just located on the same line of sight, but at a very different distance from us.

== Naming ==
In Chinese, 奎宿 (Kuí Sù), meaning Legs (asterism), refers to an asterism consisting of π Andromedae, η Andromedae, 65 Piscium, ζ Andromedae, ε Andromedae, δ Andromedae, ν Andromedae, μ Andromedae, β Andromedae, σ Piscium, τ Piscium, 91 Piscium, υ Piscium, φ Piscium, χ Piscium and ψ¹ Piscium. Consequently, the Chinese name for π Andromedae itself is 奎宿六 (Kuí Sù liù, English: the Sixth Star of Legs.)
