= Mirath =

Mirath may refer to:

- Islamic inheritance jurisprudence: Inheritance laws in Islam or (Arabic: ميراث).
- Beta Andromedae, a red giant star in the constellation of Andromeda.
