= Mu Andromedae =

Binary star in the constellation Andromeda

μ Andromedae
- Location of μ Andromedae (circled)

Observation data Epoch J2000 Equinox J2000
- Constellation: Andromeda
- Right ascension: 00^{h} 56^{m} 45.209^{s}
- Declination: +38° 29′ 57.60″
- Apparent magnitude (V): 3.87

Characteristics
- Spectral type: A5 V
- U−B color index: +0.15
- B−V color index: +0.12
- Variable type: RS CVn

Astrometry
Radial velocity (R_{v})	+7.6 km/s
Proper motion (μ)	RA: +151.021 mas/yr Dec.: +34.800 mas/yr
Parallax (π)	26.7046±0.6467 mas
Distance	122 ± 3 ly (37.4 ± 0.9 pc)
Absolute magnitude (M_{V})	+0.86

Orbit
Period (P)	550.7±0.2 d
Semi-major axis (a)	46.66±0.06 mas
Eccentricity (e)	0.8405±0.0009
Inclination (i)	52.5±0.3°
Longitude of the node (Ω)	−17.6±0.2°
Periastron epoch (T)	55765.45 ± 0.04 MJD
Argument of periastron (ω) (secondary)	168.9±0.3°
Semi-amplitude (K_{1}) (primary)	11.1±0.5 km/s

Details
Mass	2.21±0.09 M_{☉}
Radius	3.03±0.11 R_{☉}
Luminosity	40±3 L_{☉}
Surface gravity (log g)	3.99 cgs
Temperature	8,320±150 K
Metallicity [Fe/H]	+0.03 dex
Rotational velocity (v sin i)	75 km/s
Age	724±21 Myr

Other designations
- μ Andromedae, μ And, Mu And, 37 Andromedae, BD+37°175, FK5 33, HD 5448, HIP 4436, HR 269, SAO 54281, PPM 65785

Database references
SIMBAD	data

Mu Andromedae is a binary star system in the northern constellation of Andromeda. Its Bayer designation is Latinized from μ Andromedae, and abbreviated Mu And or μ And, respectively. The system has an apparent visual magnitude of 3.87, making it readily visible to the naked eye. Based upon parallax measurements, it is located at a distance of approximately 122 light-years (37 parsecs) from Earth. In the constellation, the star is situated about halfway between the bright star Mirach to the southwest and the Andromeda Galaxy (M31) to the northeast.

The spectrum of this star matches a stellar classification of A5 V, indicating that it is an A-type main sequence star. It has 2.2 times the mass of the Sun and three times the Sun's radius. The star is radiating about 40 times the luminosity of the Sun from its outer envelope at an effective temperature of 8,320 K, giving it the characteristic white glow of an A-type star. It is estimated to be about 724 million years old, with a relatively high projected rotational velocity of 75 km/s.

In 2007, Mu Andromedae was found to be a tidally-locked close binary system with an unseen companion. The two stars orbit each other every 550.7 days. The tidal interactions have spun up the primary star, causing it to become magnetically active and host unusually strong starspots.

== Naming ==
In Chinese, 奎宿 (Kuí Sù), meaning Legs (asterism), refers to an asterism consisting of μ Andromedae, η Andromedae, 65 Piscium, ζ Andromedae, ε Andromedae, δ Andromedae, π Andromedae, ν Andromedae, β Andromedae, σ Piscium, τ Piscium, 91 Piscium, υ Piscium, φ Piscium, χ Piscium and ψ¹ Piscium. Consequently, the Chinese name for μ Andromedae itself is 奎宿八 (Kuí Sù bā, English: the Eighth Star of Legs.)
