= Delta Andromedae =

Multiple star system in the constellation Andromeda

δ Andromedae
- Location of δ Andromedae (circled)

Observation data Epoch J2000.0 Equinox J2000.0 (ICRS)
- Constellation: Andromeda
- Right ascension: 00^{h} 39^{m} 19.67518^{s}
- Declination: +30° 51′ 39.6783″
- Apparent magnitude (V): 3.28

Characteristics

δ And A
- Spectral type: K3 III(Aa); K4 ± 2(Ab)
- U−B color index: +1.48
- B−V color index: +1.28
- R−I color index: +0.66

δ And B
- Spectral type: M3
- U−B color index: 0.83
- B−V color index: 1.02

Astrometry
Radial velocity (R_{v})	−9.88±0.15 km/s
Proper motion (μ)	RA: +114.45 mas/yr Dec.: −84.02 mas/yr
Parallax (π)	30.91±0.15 mas
Distance	105.5 ± 0.5 ly (32.4 ± 0.2 pc)
Absolute magnitude (M_{V})	+0.8

Orbit
Period (P)	15,000 d
Eccentricity (e)	0.34±0.14
Periastron epoch (T)	2415568 JD
Argument of periastron (ω) (primary)	356.1±5.2°
Semi-amplitude (K_{1}) (primary)	4.0±2.7 km/s

Details

δ And Aa
Mass	~1.3 M_{☉}
Radius	14.45±0.03 R_{☉}
Luminosity	68±4 L_{☉}
Surface gravity (log g)	2.0±0.3 cgs
Temperature	4,315±9 K
Metallicity [Fe/H]	0.04 dex
Rotational velocity (v sin i)	6.5 km/s
Age	3.2 Gyr

δ And Ab
Mass	0.6–0.8 M_{☉}

δ And B
Mass	0.529±0.021 M_{☉}
Radius	0.532±0.017 R_{☉}
Luminosity	0.04090 ± 0.00983 L_{☉}
Surface gravity (log g)	4.70930 ± 0.0101 cgs
Temperature	3,558±157 K

Other designations
- Kuda, δ And, 31 And, NSV 15142, BD+30 91, FK5 20, HD 3627, HIP 3092, HR 165, SAO 54058, PPM 65514, WDS 00393+3052A

Database references
SIMBAD	data

Delta Andromedae, also named Kuda /kuːdɑː/, is a triple star system in the northern constellation of Andromeda. The system is visible to the naked eye as a point of light with a combined apparent visual magnitude of 3.28. Based upon parallax measurements, it is located at a distance of approximately 105.5 light-years (32.3 parsecs) from the Sun. The system is drifting closer with a radial velocity of −10 km/s.

== Nomenclature ==
Delta Andromedae is a Bayer designation that is Latinized from δ Andromedae, and abbreviated Delta And or δ And, respectively. Apart from its Bayer designation, it was also given the title Delta by Elijah H. Burritt in his star atlas.

In Chinese astronomy, 奎宿 (Kuí Sù), meaning Legs (asterism), refers to an asterism consisting of δ Andromedae, η Andromedae, 65 Piscium, ζ Andromedae, ι Piscium, ε Andromedae, π Andromedae, ν Andromedae, μ Andromedae, β Andromedae, σ Piscium, τ Piscium, 91 Piscium, υ Piscium, φ Piscium, χ Piscium and ψ^{1} Piscium. Consequently, the Chinese name for δ Andromedae itself is 奎宿五 (Kuí Sù wǔ, English: the Fifth Star of Legs.)

Kuda is a constellation of a horse used on the Indonesian islands of Bali and Java. It corresponds to Pegasus and parts of Andromeda. The word Kuda is Malay, borrowed from Tamil குதிரை, kutirai. The IAU Working Group on Star Names adopted the name Kuda for δ Andromedae Aa on 15 October 2026.

== Properties ==
This is a long-period spectroscopic binary with an orbital period of approximately 15,000 days (41 years). The primary of the spectroscopic binary, component Aa, has a stellar classification of K3 III, indicating that it is an aging giant star. It most likely evolved from a F-type main sequence star after consuming the hydrogen at its core. The secondary, component Ab, is a relatively faint K-type dwarf, which has been imaged using a stellar coronagraph. The pair have a physical separation of 11.55±0.13 AU.

The system has two companions, the closest of which is an orbiting red dwarf of class M3 with a separation of at least 940 astronomical units.

An excess of infrared emission from δ Andromedae suggested that it may be surrounded by a shell of dust. In 2003 it was determined that this is more likely a circumstellar debris disk.
