= Zeta Andromedae =

Star system in the constellation Andromeda

ζ Andromedae
- Location of ζ Andromedae

Observation data Epoch J2000 Equinox ICRS
- Constellation: Andromeda
- Right ascension: 00^{h} 47^{m} 20.326^{s}
- Declination: +24° 16′ 01.84″
- Apparent magnitude (V): 3.92 to 4.14

Characteristics
- Spectral type: K1III + KV or D
- U−B color index: +0.90
- B−V color index: +1.12
- R−I color index: +0.59
- Variable type: ELL/RS

Astrometry
Radial velocity (R_{v})	−24.43±0.1 km/s
Proper motion (μ)	RA: −101.068 mas/yr Dec.: −80.276 mas/yr
Parallax (π)	18.0083±0.1604 mas
Distance	181 ± 2 ly (55.5 ± 0.5 pc)
Absolute magnitude (M_{V})	+0.14

Orbit
Period (P)	17.769426 days
Semi-major axis (a)	2.7 R_{☉}
Eccentricity (e)	0.0
Inclination (i)	65±5°

Details

Aa
Mass	2.6±0.4 M_{☉}
Radius	15.9±0.8 R_{☉}
Luminosity	95.5 L_{☉}
Surface gravity (log g)	2.8 cgs
Temperature	4,665±140 K
Metallicity [Fe/H]	−0.30 dex
Rotation	17.77 days
Rotational velocity (v sin i)	41.4±0.2 km/s

Ab
Mass	0.75 M_{☉}

Other designations
- Shimu, ζ And, Zeta Andromedae, Zet And, 34 Andromedae, 34 And, BD+23 106, FK5 27, GC 940, HD 4502, HIP 3693, HR 215, SAO 74267, PPM 90149, CCDM J00473+2416A, WDS 00473+2416A

Database references
SIMBAD	data

Zeta Andromedae, also named Shimu /ʃiːmuː/, is a binary star system in the northern constellation Andromeda. It is visible to the naked eye with an apparent visual magnitude that varies from 3.92 to 4.14 over the course of its 17.7 day orbit. Based on parallax measurements, it is located at a distance of approximately 181 light-years from the Sun. The system is drifting closer with a heliocentric radial velocity of −24.4 km/s.

== Naming ==
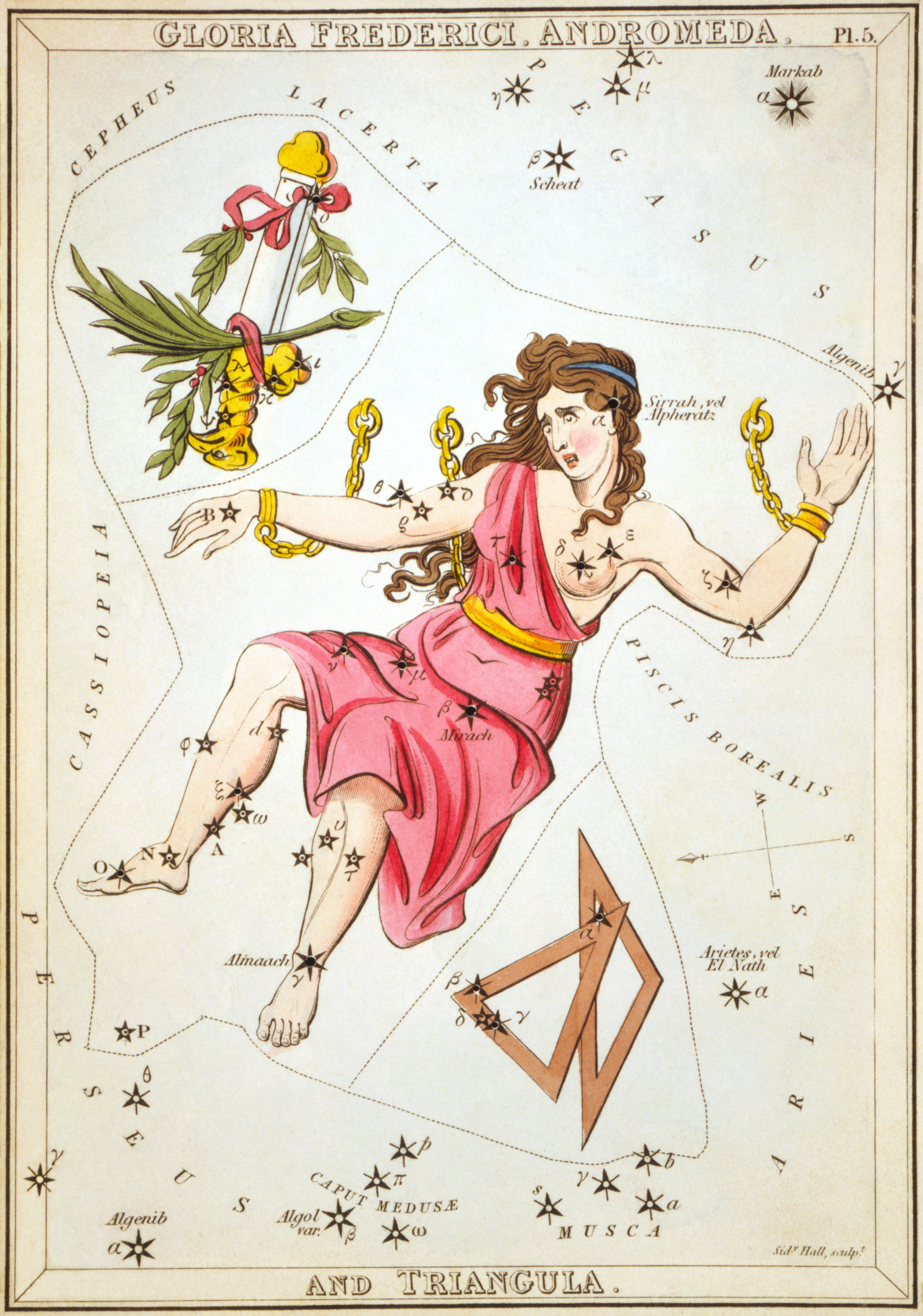
Sidney Hall - Urania's Mirror - Gloria Frederici, Andromeda, and Triangula (north is to the left)

The star's location is in the northern constellation Andromeda, in which it is the second-most southerly of the stars in this often drawn characteristic shape representing the mythical princess asterism, after η Andromedae.

Zeta Andromedae (Zeta And, ζ Andromedae, ζ And) is the star's Bayer designation. It also has the Flamsteed designation 34 Andromedae and multiple other designations in stellar catalogues.

In Chinese, 奎宿 (Kuí Sù), meaning Legs (asterism), refers to an asterism consisting of ζ Andromedae, η Andromedae, 65 Piscium, ε Andromedae, δ Andromedae, π Andromedae, ν Andromedae, μ Andromedae, β Andromedae, σ Piscium, τ Piscium, 91 Piscium, υ Piscium, φ Piscium, χ Piscium and ψ^{1} Piscium. Consequently, the Chinese name for ζ Andromedae itself is 奎宿二 (Kuí Sù èr, English: the Second Star of Legs).

An older Chinese name is Tian Shi Mu (天豕目), The Eye of the Celestial Pig. Based on this, the IAU Working Group on Star Names approved the name Shimu (豕目, lit. 'pig's eye') for Zeta Andromedae A on 16 March 2025 and it is now so entered in the IAU Catalog of Star Names.

== System ==
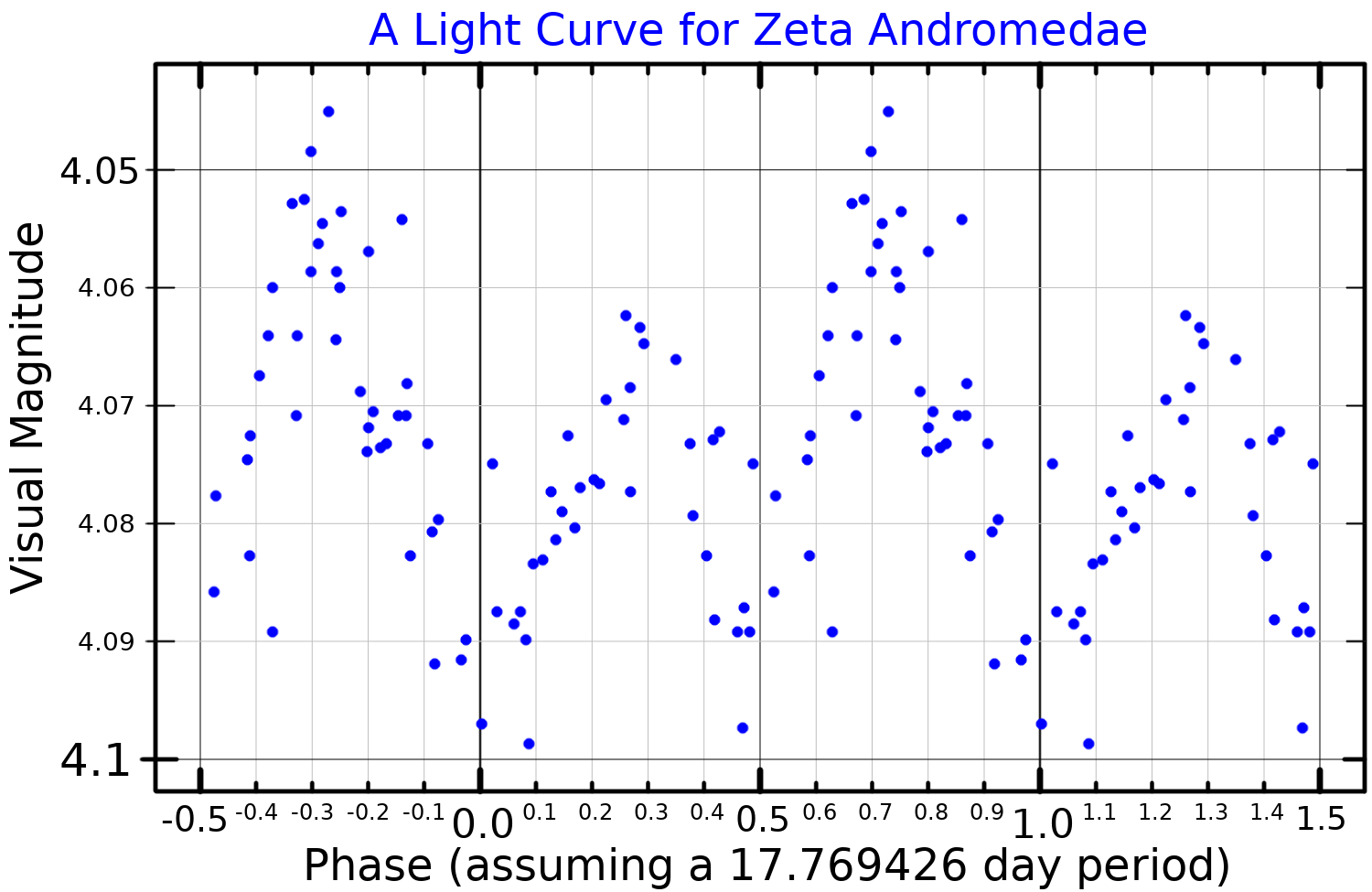
A visual band light curve for Zeta Andromedae, adapted from Kővári et al. (2006)

The system is a spectroscopic binary whose primary is classified as an orange K-type giant with a mean apparent magnitude of +4.08. Due to brightness changes caused by the ellipsoidal shape of that object, the system is also an RS Canum Venaticorum-type variable star. It is a magnetically active star with a brightness that varies from magnitude +3.92 to +4.14 over a period of 17.77 days, and its spectrum shows strong and variable Ca II H and K lines. The orbital period of the binary is 17.77 days. The secondary could be either a K-type main sequence star or a white dwarf.

The primary component of this binary system, Zeta Andromedae Aa, is one of the few stars who has been resolved using Doppler imaging and long-baseline infrared interferometry. With resolved images astronomers can recover additional information about this star.

Additional star parameters
Parameter	Value
Oblateness	1.060±0.011
Polar radius	15.0±0.8 R_{☉}
Axis Inclination (Note: Azimuthal angle between the rotational axis and our line of sight)	70.0°±2.8°
Pole angle (Note: Longitudinal angle between the north pole and the East direction)	126°±1.9°

Resolved images also allowed observation of starspots (the analogue to sunspots), on this star, and their asymmetric distribution showed that the magnetic field of the star is generated by a mechanism different from the solar dynamo. A Sun-like differential rotation of the star was observed instead.

== Visual companions ==
The WDS notes three visual companions to the eclipsing binary (Aa and Ab, forming binary A). The parallax of the D star has been measured by Gaia proving its distance to be much greater than Zeta Andromedae, probably a distant red giant. The closest companion, B, is likewise a background object. The companion C at 97″ shares a common proper motion and a similar parallax.

Multiple/double star designation: WDS 00473+2416
Component	Primary	Right ascension (α) Equinox J2000.0	Declination (δ) Equinox J2000.0	Epoch of observed separation	Angular distance from primary	Position angle (relative to primary)	Apparent magnitude (V)	Database reference
B	A	00^{h} 47^{m} 20.2^{s}	+24° 16′ 33″	1959	32.6″	0°	15.3	
C	A	00^{h} 47^{m} 15.2^{s}	+24° 15′ 03″	1997	97.0″	231°	13.6	
D	A	00^{h} 47^{m} 09.0^{s}	+24° 15′ 33″	2006	155.5″	260°	10.80	SIMBAD
