= Nu Andromedae =

Binary star in the constellation Andromeda

- Location of ν Andromedae (circled)

Observation data Epoch J2000 Equinox ICRS
- Constellation: Andromeda
- Right ascension: 00^{h} 49^{m} 48.846^{s}
- Declination: +41° 04′ 44.08″
- Apparent magnitude (V): 4.522

Characteristics
- Spectral type: B4/5 V + F8 V
- U−B color index: –0.573
- B−V color index: –0.136

Astrometry
Radial velocity (R_{v})	–23.9 km/s
Proper motion (μ)	RA: +21.711 mas/yr Dec.: –18.694 mas/yr
Parallax (π)	5.7868±0.1857 mas
Distance	560 ± 20 ly (173 ± 6 pc)
Absolute magnitude (M_{V})	−1.85

Orbit
Period (P)	4.2827 d
Eccentricity (e)	0.03
Longitude of the node (Ω)	25.°
Periastron epoch (T)	18,155.67
Semi-amplitude (K_{1}) (primary)	71.7 km/s
Semi-amplitude (K_{2}) (secondary)	101.9 km/s

Details

ν And A
Mass	5.9±0.2 M_{☉}
Radius	3.4 R_{☉}
Luminosity	1,104 L_{☉}
Surface gravity (log g)	4.12±0.43 cgs
Temperature	14,851±396 K
Metallicity [Fe/H]	+0.14±0.17 dex
Rotational velocity (v sin i)	20 km/s
Age	63.1±17.9 Myr

Other designations
- ν Andromedae, ν And, Nu And, 35 Andromedae, 35 And, BD+40 171, FK5 1021, HD 4727, HIP 3881, HR 226, SAO 36699, PPM 43365

Database references
SIMBAD	data

Nu Andromedae is a binary star system in the constellation Andromeda. Its Bayer designation is Latinized from ν Andromedae, and abbreviated Nu And or ν And, respectively. The system has an apparent visual magnitude of 4.5, which is bright enough to be seen with the naked eye. Based on parallax measurements, it is located at a distance of approximately 560 light-years (170 parsecs) from Earth. The pair are drifting closer with a heliocentric radial velocity of –24 km/s. Situated just over a degree to the west of this star is the Andromeda Galaxy.

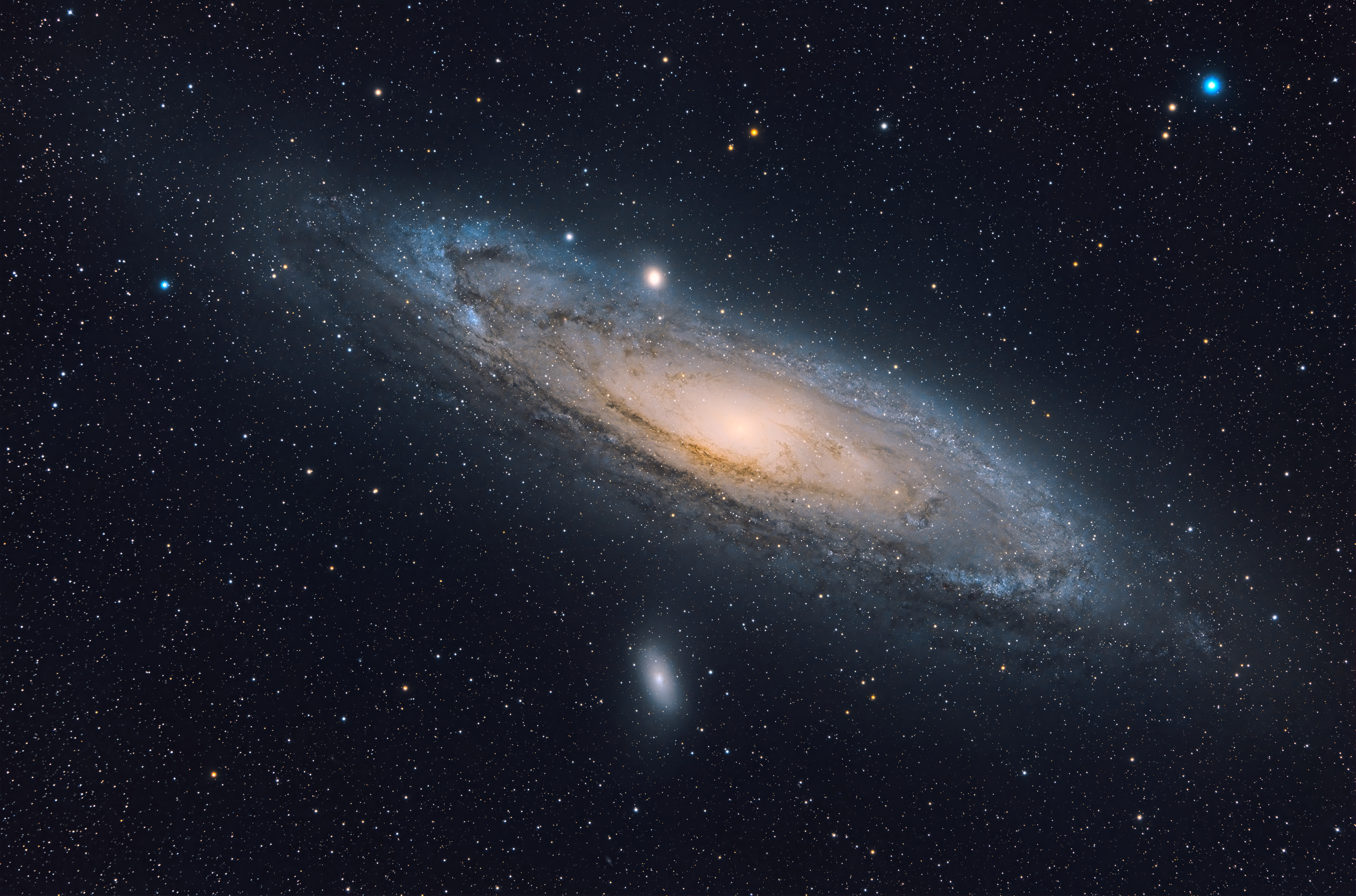
Nu Andromedae is the prominent blue star in the upper right of this image. At the center is the Andromeda Galaxy.

Nu Andromedae is close spectroscopic binary system with a period of 4.2828 days and a nearly circular orbit. The primary component is a B-type main sequence star with a stellar classification of B5 V. The fainter secondary has a classification of F8 V, which makes it an F-type main sequence star. The pair is about 63 million years old.

The pair have a peculiar velocity of 22.16±0.87 km/s relative to neighboring stars, which doesn't qualify it to be a runaway star system but does suggest it escaped its star cluster of origin. The trajectory indicates it may have left the NGC 6405 cluster some 25 million years ago.

== Naming ==
In Chinese, 奎宿 (Kuí Sù), meaning Legs (asterism), refers to an asterism consisting of ν Andromedae, η Andromedae, 65 Piscium, ζ Andromedae, ε Andromedae, δ Andromedae, π Andromedae, μ Andromedae, β Andromedae, σ Piscium, τ Piscium, 91 Piscium, υ Piscium, φ Piscium, χ Piscium and ψ^{1} Piscium. Consequently, the Chinese name for ν Andromedae itself is 奎宿七 (Kuí Sù qī, English: the Seventh Star of Legs.)
