= Epsilon Andromedae =

Star in the constellation Andromeda

ε Andromedae
- Location of ε Andromedae (circled)

Observation data Epoch J2000.0 Equinox J2000.0 (ICRS)
- Constellation: Andromeda
- Right ascension: 00^{h} 38^{m} 33.347^{s}
- Declination: +29° 18′ 42.31″
- Apparent magnitude (V): 4.357

Characteristics
- Evolutionary stage: red clump
- Spectral type: G6 III Fe−3 CH1
- U−B color index: +0.463
- B−V color index: +0.8713
- V−R color index: +0.6
- R−I color index: +0.51

Astrometry
Radial velocity (R_{v})	−84.43±0.15 km/s
Proper motion (μ)	RA: −228.701 mas/yr Dec.: −253.206 mas/yr
Parallax (π)	19.2451±0.1188 mas
Distance	169 ± 1 ly (52.0 ± 0.3 pc)
Absolute magnitude (M_{V})	+0.69

Details
Mass	1.01±0.35 M_{☉}
Radius	9.04±0.34 R_{☉}
Luminosity	51.3 L_{☉}
Surface gravity (log g)	2.88±0.02 cgs
Temperature	5,082±20 K
Metallicity [Fe/H]	−0.53±0.05 dex
Rotational velocity (v sin i)	1.70±0.45 km/s
Age	5.71±5.29 Gyr

Other designations
- Anunitu, ε And, 30 Andromedae, BD+28°103, FK5 19, GC 759, HD 3546, HIP 3031, HR 163, SAO 74164, PPM 90002, LTT 10215, NLTT 2065

Database references
SIMBAD	data

Epsilon Andromedae, also named Anunitu /ənuːnituː/, is a star in the constellation of Andromeda. This star can be seen with the naked eye, having an apparent visual magnitude of 4.4. Based upon an annual parallax shift of 19.2 mas as seen from Earth, it is located approximately 169 light years from the Sun. The system is moving closer to the Sun with a radial velocity of −84 km/s. Its orbit in the Milky Way is highly eccentric, causing it to move rapidly relative to the Sun and its neighboring stars.

== Nomenclature ==
Epsilon Andromedae is a Bayer designation that is Latinized from ε Andromedae, and abbreviated eps And or ε And, respectively.

In Chinese astronomy, 奎宿 (Kuí Sù), meaning Legs (asterism), refers to an asterism consisting of ε Andromedae, η Andromedae, 65 Piscium, ζ Andromedae, δ Andromedae, π Andromedae, ν Andromedae, μ Andromedae, β Andromedae, σ Piscium, τ Piscium, 91 Piscium, υ Piscium, φ Piscium, χ Piscium and ψ¹ Piscium. Consequently, the Chinese name for ε Andromedae itself is 奎宿四 (Kuí Sù sì, English: the Fourth Star of Legs.)

Anunītu is a Mesopotamian goddess, originally an epithet of Ishtar, whose constellation was visualized in Andromeda and Pisces in ancient times. The IAU Working Group on Star Names adopted the name Anunitu for this star on 15 October 2026.

== Properties ==
This is an evolved G-type giant star with a stellar classification of G6 III Fe−3 CH1. The suffix notation indicates there is a strong underabundance of iron in the spectrum, and an overabundance of cyanogen (CN). ε Andromedae is believed to be a red clump star which is fusing helium in its core. It has about the same mass as the Sun, but has expanded to nine times the Sun's radius. The star is radiating 51 times the Sun's luminosity from its enlarged photosphere at an effective temperature of 5,082 K.
