= Eta Andromedae =

Spectroscopic binary star in the constellation Andromeda

η Andromedae
- Location of η Andromedae (circled)

Observation data Epoch J2000.0 Equinox J2000.0 (ICRS)
- Constellation: Andromeda
- Right ascension: 00^{h} 57^{m} 12.400^{s}
- Declination: +23° 25′ 03.54″
- Apparent magnitude (V): 4.403

Characteristics
- Spectral type: G8III-IV + G8III-IV
- U−B color index: +0.69
- B−V color index: +0.94
- R−I color index: +0.48

Astrometry

η And A
Radial velocity (R_{v})	−10.30±0.29 km/s
Proper motion (μ)	RA: −43.008 mas/yr Dec.: −45.254 mas/yr
Parallax (π)	12.5624±0.2525 mas
Distance	260 ± 5 ly (80 ± 2 pc)
Absolute magnitude (M_{V})	0.52±0.06

η And B
Absolute magnitude (M_{V})	1.07±0.07

Orbit
Period (P)	115.72±0.01 d
Semi-major axis (a)	10.37±0.03 mas
Eccentricity (e)	0.006±0.002
Inclination (i)	30.5±0.4°
Longitude of the node (Ω)	69.4±0.5°
Periastron epoch (T)	48013±1 MJD
Argument of periastron (ω) (secondary)	215±4°

Details

η And A
Mass	2.6±0.35 M_{☉}
Radius	10.7 R_{☉}
Luminosity (bolometric)	65±3 L_{☉}
Surface gravity (log g)	2.8 cgs
Temperature	4,900 K
Age	800 Myr

η And B
Mass	2.3±0.31 M_{☉}
Radius	8.6 R_{☉}
Luminosity (bolometric)	39±3 L_{☉}
Surface gravity (log g)	3.0 cgs
Temperature	4,900 K

Other designations
- Kui, η Andromedae, η And, Eta And, 38 Andromedae, 38 And, BD+22°153, FK5 2060, GC 1136, HD 5516, HIP 4463, HR 271, SAO 74388, PPM 90327, CCDM J00572+2325A, WDS 00572+2325A/Aa

Database references
SIMBAD	data

Eta Andromedae, also named Kui /kuːi/, is a spectroscopic binary star system in the northern constellation of Andromeda. It consists of two G-type evolved stars orbiting each other with a period of 115.7 days and has an overall apparent visual magnitude of approximately 4.403. Based on parallax measurements, this system is located at a distance of approximately 260 light years from the Sun. But it is drawing closer with a heliocentric radial velocity of −10.30 km/s.

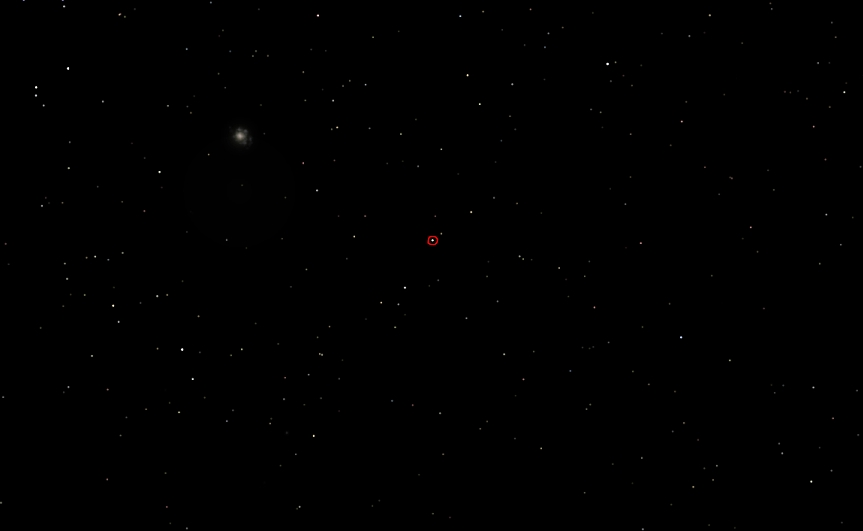
η Andromedae system as seen from earth orbit, M 33 in background

This star was discovered to be a double-lined spectroscopic binary in a series of spectra taken in 1899 and 1900. Its orbit was computed in 1946 from spectroscopic observations. Because spectroscopy only reveals the radial velocity of a star towards or away from the viewer, such a computation does not determine all orbital elements. In observations made from 1990 to 1992, Eta Andromedae was resolved interferometrically by the Mark III Stellar Interferometer at Mount Wilson Observatory, California, United States. This allowed a more complete orbit to be computed and, in 1993, published.

The primary component has 2.6 times the mass of the Sun and 10.7 times the Sun's radius. It is radiating 65 times the Sun's luminosity from its enlarged photosphere at an effective temperature of 4,900 K. The fainter secondary member has 2.3 times the mass and 8.6 times the radius of the Sun. It radiates 39 times the luminosity of the Sun at a temperature of 4,900 K.

Eta Andromedae has a visual companion star of apparent visual magnitude 11.5, BD+22°153B, visible 129.2 arcseconds away.

== Naming ==
In Chinese, 奎宿 (Kuí Sù), meaning Legs (asterism), refers to an asterism consisting of η Andromedae, 65 Piscium, ζ Andromedae, ε Andromedae, δ Andromedae, π Andromedae, ν Andromedae, μ Andromedae, β Andromedae, σ Piscium, τ Piscium, 91 Piscium, υ Piscium, φ Piscium, χ Piscium and ψ¹ Piscium. Consequently, the Chinese name for η Andromedae itself is 奎宿一 (Kuí Sù yī, English: the First Star of Legs.) The IAU Working Group on Star Names approved the name Kui for Eta Andromedae A, on 6 April 2025 and it is now so entered in the IAU Catalog of Star Names.
