= Mirach =

Star in the constellation Andromeda

- Location of Mirach (circled)

Observation data Epoch J2000.0 Equinox J2000.0 (ICRS)
- Constellation: Andromeda
- Right ascension: 01^{h} 09^{m} 43.91^{s}
- Declination: +35° 37′ 13.8″
- Apparent magnitude (V): 2.01 to 2.10

Characteristics
- Evolutionary stage: Asymptotic giant branch
- Spectral type: M0 III
- U−B color index: +1.96
- B−V color index: +1.57
- V−R color index: 0.9
- R−I color index: +1.00
- Variable type: Semiregular

Astrometry
Radial velocity (R_{v})	0.06±0.13 km/s
Proper motion (μ)	RA: 175.90 mas/yr Dec.: −112.20 mas/yr
Parallax (π)	16.52±0.56 mas
Distance	197 ± 7 ly (61 ± 2 pc)
Absolute magnitude (M_{V})	−1.76

Details
Mass	2.49 M_{☉}
Radius	86.4 R_{☉}
Luminosity	1,675 L_{☉}
Surface gravity (log g)	0.91±0.10 cgs
Temperature	3,762±40 K
Metallicity [Fe/H]	−0.46±0.03 dex
Rotation	<7900 d (<21.6 years)
Rotational velocity (v sin i)	6 km/s

Other designations
- Mirach, Merach, Mirac, Mizar, β And, Beta Andromedae, Beta And, 43 Andromedae, 43 And, BD+34°198, FK5 42, GJ 53.3, 9044, HD 6860, HIP 5447, HR 337, SAO 54471, PPM 66010, WDS 01097+3537A, LTT 10420, NLTT 3848

Database references
SIMBAD	data

Mirach is a prominent star in the northern constellation of Andromeda. It is pronounced /ˈmaɪræk/ and has the Bayer designation Beta Andromedae, which is Latinized from β Andromedae. This star is positioned northeast of the Great Square of Pegasus and is potentially visible to all observers north of latitude 54° S. It is commonly used by stargazers to find the Andromeda Galaxy. The galaxy NGC 404, also known as Mirach's Ghost, is seven arcminutes away from Mirach.

This star has an apparent visual magnitude that varies between 2.01 and 2.10, which at times makes it the brightest star in the constellation. Based upon parallax measurements, it is roughly 197 light-years (60 parsecs) from the Solar System. Its apparent magnitude is reduced by 0.06 by extinction due to gas and dust along the line of sight. The star has a negligible radial velocity of 0.1 km/s, but with a relatively large proper motion, traversing the celestial sphere at an angular rate of 0.208″·yr^{−1}.

== Properties ==
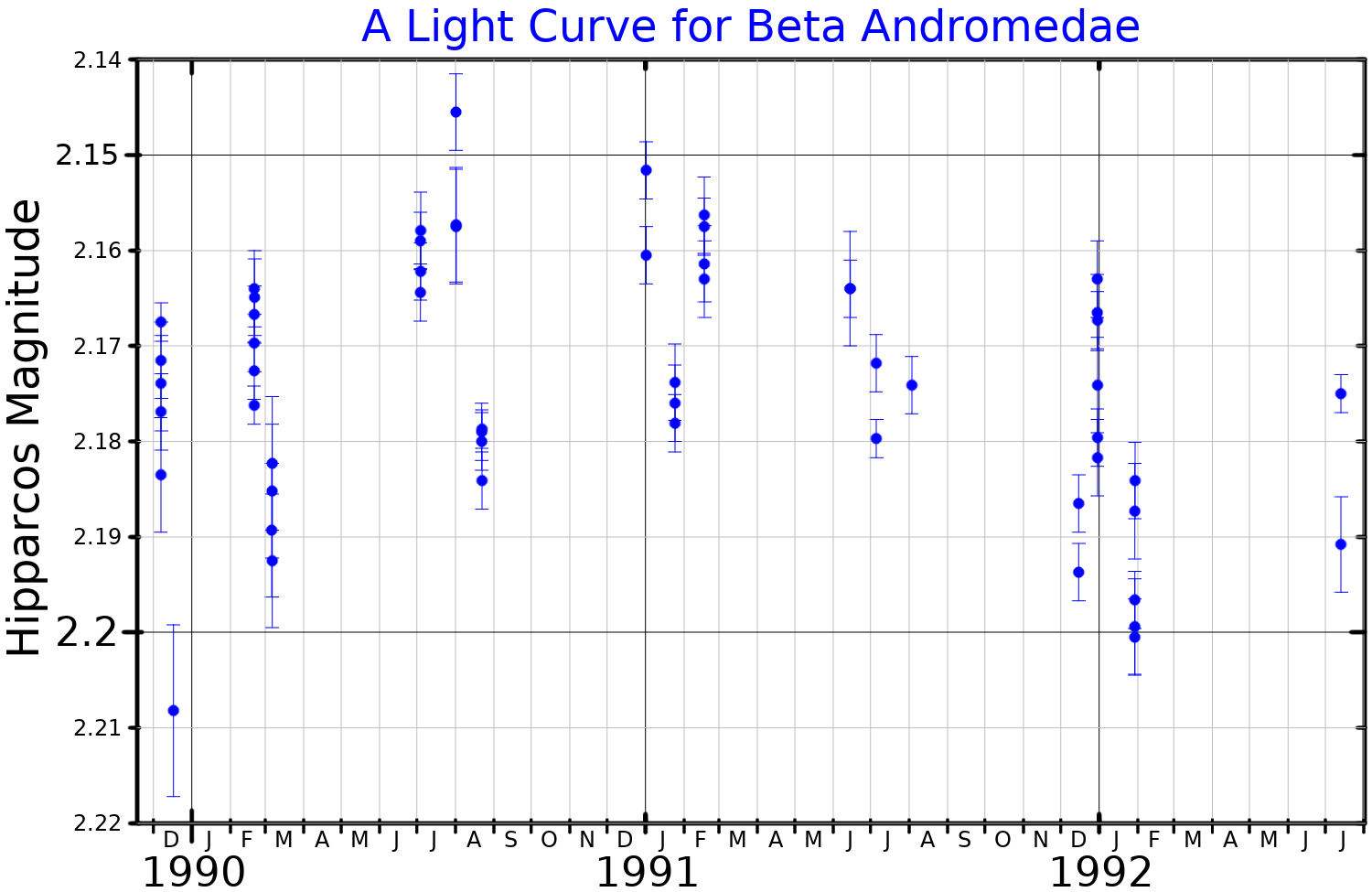
A light curve for Mirach, plotted from Hipparcos data

Mirach is a single, aging red giant with a stellar classification of M0 III. It is currently on the asymptotic giant branch of its evolution. The star has an estimated 2.49 times the mass of the Sun. Having exhausted the supply of hydrogen at its core, the outer envelope of the star has expanded to around 86 times the size of the Sun. It is radiating 1,675 times the luminosity of the Sun at an effective temperature of 3,762 K. Mirach is suspected of being a semiregular variable star, with an apparent visual magnitude varies from +2.01 to +2.10. Since 1943 the spectrum of this star has been one of the stable anchor points by which other stars are classified.

== Nomenclature ==
Beta Andromedae is the star's Bayer designation. It had the traditional name of Mirach, and its variations, such as Mirac, Mirar, Mirath, Mirak, etc. (the name is spelled Merach in Burritt's The Geography of the Heavens), which come from the star's description in the Alfonsine Tables of 1521 as super mizar. Here, mirat is a corruption of the Arabic مئزر mīzar "girdle", which appeared in a Latin translation of the Almagest. This word refers to Mirach's position at the left hip of the princess Andromeda. In 2016, the International Astronomical Union organized a Working Group on Star Names (WGSN) to catalog and standardize proper names for stars. The WGSN's first bulletin of July 2016 included a table of the first two batches of names approved by the WGSN; which included Mirach for this star.

Mirach is listed in the Babylonian MUL.APIN as KA.MUSH.I.KU.E, meaning "the Deleter" (the alternative star is α Cas). Medieval astronomers writing in Arabic called Mirach Janb al-Musalsalah (English: The Side of the Chained (Lady)); it was part of the 28th manzil (Arabian lunar mansion) Baṭn al-Ḥūt, the Belly of the Fish, or Qalb al-Ḥūt, the Heart of the Fish. The star has also been called Cingulum and Ventrale. This al-Ḥūt was an indigenous Arabic constellation, not the Western "Northern Fish" part of the constellation Pisces. These names are not from the Arabic marāqq, loins, because it was never called al-Marāqq in Arabian astronomy. Al Rishā', the Cord (of the well-bucket), on al-Sūfī's star map. It is the origin of the proper name Alrescha for Alpha Piscium.

In Chinese, 奎宿 (Kuí Sù), meaning Legs, refers to an asterism consisting of Mirach (β Andromedae), η Andromedae, 65 Piscium, ζ Andromedae, ε Andromedae, δ Andromedae, π Andromedae, ν Andromedae, μ Andromedae, σ Piscium, τ Piscium, 91 Piscium, υ Piscium, φ Piscium, χ Piscium and ψ^{1} Piscium. Consequently, the Chinese name for β Andromedae itself is 奎宿九 (Kuí Sù jiǔ, English: the Ninth Star of Legs). Mirach was considered the standard "black" star; black could mean "dark red" in this context, especially in comparison to Antares, the standard red star.

The people of Micronesia named this star Kyyw, meaning "The Porpoise", and this was used as one of the names of the months in Micronesia.

== Substellar companion ==
A 2023 study detected radial velocity variations in Mirach (HD 6860), showing evidence of a substellar companion, likely a brown dwarf.

The Mirach planetary system
Companion (in order from star)	Mass	Semimajor axis (AU)	Orbital period (days)	Eccentricity	Inclination (°)	Radius
b	≥28.26+2.05 −2.17 M_{J}	2.03±0.01	663.87+4.61 −4.31	0.28+0.10 −0.09	—	—
