= Sigma Piscium =

Star in the constellation Pisces

σ Piscium
- Location of σ Piscium (circled)

Observation data Epoch J2000.0 Equinox ICRS
- Constellation: Pisces
- Right ascension: 01^{h} 02^{m} 49.09645^{s}
- Declination: +31° 48′ 15.3471″
- Apparent magnitude (V): +5.50

Characteristics
- Spectral type: B9.5V + B9.5V
- U−B color index: −0.20
- B−V color index: −0.04

Astrometry
Radial velocity (R_{v})	10.4 ± 0.9 km/s
Proper motion (μ)	RA: 14.33 mas/yr Dec.: −30.25 mas/yr
Parallax (π)	8.86±0.07 mas
Distance	368 ± 3 ly (112.9 ± 0.9 pc)
Absolute magnitude (M_{V})	−0.12

Orbit
Period (P)	81.12625 ± 2.7 d
Semi-major axis (a)	5.56 ± 0.04 mas
Eccentricity (e)	0.8956 ± 0.0020
Inclination (i)	143.4 ± 1.3°
Longitude of the node (Ω)	167.8 ± 1.7°
Periastron epoch (T)	MJD 31308.153 ± 0.023
Argument of periastron (ω) (secondary)	346.6 ± 2.0°
Semi-amplitude (K_{1}) (primary)	53.2 ± 1.9 km/s
Semi-amplitude (K_{2}) (secondary)	59.6 ± 1.6 km/s

Details

σ Psc A
Mass	2.65 ± 0.27 M_{☉}

σ Psc B
Mass	2.36 ± 0.24 M_{☉}

Other designations
- σ Psc, 69 Psc, BD+31°168, HD 6118, HIP 4889, HR 291, SAO 54374, PPM 65899

Database references
SIMBAD	data

Sigma Piscium (Sigma Psc, σ Piscium, σ Psc) is a binary star in the zodiac constellation of Pisces. It has an apparent magnitude of +5.50, meaning it is barely visible to the naked eye, according to the Bortle scale. While parallax measurements by the Hipparcos spacecraft give a distance of approximately 430 light years (133 parsecs), dynamical parallax measurements put it slightly closer, at 368 light-years (113 parsecs) from Earth.

Sigma Piscium is a spectroscopic binary system, meaning the components of the system have been detected from periodic Doppler shifts in their spectra. In this case, light from both stars can be detected and it is double-lined. It has an orbital period of 81 days, and the orbit is relatively eccentric, at about 0.9. Both components are B-type main-sequence stars.

Sigma Piscium is moving through the Milky Way at a speed of 23.5 km/s relative to the Sun. Its projected galactic orbit carries it between 24,300 and 29,400 light years from the center of the galaxy.

Sigma Piscium was a latter designation of 40 Andromedae.

== Naming ==
In Chinese, 奎宿 (Kuí Sù), meaning Legs, refers to an asterism consisting of σ Piscium, η Andromedae, 65 Piscium, ζ Andromedae, ε Andromedae, δ Andromedae, π Andromedae, ν Andromedae, μ Andromedae, β Andromedae, τ Piscium, 91 Piscium, υ Piscium, φ Piscium, χ Piscium and ψ^{1} Piscium. Consequently, the Chinese name for σ Piscium itself is 奎宿十 (Kuí Sù shí, English: the Tenth Star of Legs.) Sigma Piscium, however, is also identified with Kuísùzēngshíwǔ (奎宿增十五), the 15th additional star in the Legs asterism.
