= Phi Piscium =

Quadruple star system in the constellation Pisces

- Location of φ Piscium(circled)

Observation data Epoch J2000.0 Equinox ICRS
- Constellation: Pisces
- Right ascension: 01^{h} 13^{m} 44.94617^{s}
- Declination: +24° 35′ 01.3249″
- Apparent magnitude (V): 4.676 (A)/9.11 (B)

Characteristics

φ Psc A
- Spectral type: K0III
- B−V color index: +1.03

φ Psc B
- Spectral type: K0
- U−B color index: +0.25
- B−V color index: +0.92

Astrometry
Radial velocity (R_{v})	5.9 km/s
Proper motion (μ)	RA: 16.901 mas/yr Dec.: −21.415 mas/yr
Parallax (π)	8.1541±0.2028 mas
Distance	400 ± 10 ly (123 ± 3 pc)
Absolute magnitude (M_{V})	−0.67

Orbit
Name	φ Psc B
Period (P)	7473±3 d yr
Eccentricity (e)	0.815±0.005
Argument of periastron (ω) (secondary)	71.9±1.7°

Details

A
Radius	23.63+0.66 −1.36 R_{☉}
Luminosity	249.6±7.1 L_{☉}
Surface gravity (log g)	2.75 cgs
Temperature	4,720+142 −65 K
Metallicity [Fe/H]	−0.08 dex

Other designations
- Phi Psc, φ Psc, 85 Piscium, BD+23°158, FK5 2082, GC 1474, HD 7318, HIP 5742, HR 360, SAO 74571, PPM 90580, CCDM J01137+2435A, WDS J01137+2435A

Database references
SIMBAD	data

Phi Piscium, Latinized from φ Piscium, is a quadruple star system approximately 380 light years away in the constellation Pisces. It consists of Phi Piscium A, with a spectral type of K0III, and Phi Piscium B. Phi Piscium A possesses a surface temperature of 3,500 to 5,000 kelvins. Some suggest the only visible companion in the Phi Piscium B sub-system is a late F dwarf star, while others suggest it is a K0 star. The invisible component of the Phi Piscium B sub-system is proposed to have a spectral type of M2V. The star system has a period of about 20½ years and has a notably high eccentricity of 0.815.

== Naming ==
In Chinese, 奎宿 (Kuí Sù), meaning Legs (asterism), refers to an asterism consisting of refers to an asterism consisting of φ Piscium, η Andromedae, 65 Piscium, ζ Andromedae, ε Andromedae, δ Andromedae, π Andromedae, ν Andromedae, μ Andromedae, β Andromedae, σ Piscium, τ Piscium, 91 Piscium, υ Piscium, χ Piscium and ψ¹ Piscium. Consequently, φ Piscium itself is known as 奎宿十四 (Kuí Sù shí sì, English: the Fourteenth Star of Legs.)
