= HD 6 =

Star in the constellation Pisces

- Location of HD 6 (circled in red)

Observation data Epoch J2000.0 Equinox J2000.0 (ICRS)
- Constellation: Pisces
- Right ascension: 00^{h} 05^{m} 03.82275^{s}
- Declination: −00° 30′ 10.9286″
- Apparent magnitude (V): 6.30±0.01

Characteristics
- Evolutionary stage: horizontal branch
- Spectral type: K0 III
- U−B color index: +1.03
- B−V color index: +1.11

Astrometry
Radial velocity (R_{v})	+14.91±0.12 km/s
Proper motion (μ)	RA: +45.245 mas/yr Dec.: −53.594 mas/yr
Parallax (π)	6.9277±0.0368 mas
Distance	471 ± 3 ly (144.3 ± 0.8 pc)
Absolute magnitude (M_{V})	0.62

Details
Mass	1.95 M_{☉}
Radius	12.4 R_{☉}
Luminosity	72.4 L_{☉}
Surface gravity (log g)	1.8 cgs
Temperature	4,807±75 K
Metallicity [Fe/H]	−0.03 dex
Rotational velocity (v sin i)	2.8±0.8 km/s
Age	1.62 Gyr

Other designations
- 62 G. Piscium, AG−00°4, BD−01°4525, GC 51, HD 6, HIP 417, HR 2, SAO 128569

Database references
SIMBAD	data

HD 6 is a star in the equatorial constellation of Pisces, and is located a couple of degrees southeast of the intersection between the ecliptic and the celestial equator. It is a yellow-hued star that is just barely visible to the naked eye with an apparent visual magnitude of 6.3. The star is located at a distance of 471 light-years from the Sun based on parallax, and is drifting further away with a radial velocity of 14.9 km/s. It has an absolute magnitude of 0.62.

An evolved red giant with a stellar classification K0 III, the star has moved off the main sequence by cooling and expanding. At the age of 1.6 billion years, is now a red clump giant on the horizontal branch that is engaged in core helium fusion. It has nearly double the mass of the Sun and has expanded to 12.4 times the Sun's radius. The star is radiating 72 times the luminosity of the Sun from its photosphere at an effective temperature of 4,807 K.
