= Upsilon Piscium =

A-type main sequence star in the constellation Pisces

- Location of υ Piscium (circled)

Observation data Epoch J2000.0 Equinox J2000.0 (ICRS)
- Constellation: Pisces
- Right ascension: 01^{h} 19^{m} 27.99289^{s}
- Declination: +27° 15′ 50.6155″
- Apparent magnitude (V): 4.752

Characteristics
- Evolutionary stage: main sequence
- Spectral type: A3 V
- U−B color index: +0.10
- B−V color index: +0.03

Astrometry
Radial velocity (R_{v})	+5.8±2.7 km/s
Proper motion (μ)	RA: +22.98 mas/yr Dec.: −11.12 mas/yr
Parallax (π)	10.59±0.25 mas
Distance	308 ± 7 ly (94 ± 2 pc)
Absolute magnitude (M_{V})	−0.13

Details
Mass	2.24 M_{☉}
Radius	4.36 R_{☉}
Luminosity	107 L_{☉}
Surface gravity (log g)	3.51 cgs
Temperature	8,892 K
Metallicity [Fe/H]	+0.00±0.05 dex
Rotational velocity (v sin i)	91 km/s
Age	461 Myr

Other designations
- υ Psc, 90 Piscium, BD+26°220, FK5 45, HD 7964, HIP 6193, HR 383, SAO 74637

Database references
SIMBAD	data

Upsilon Piscium is a solitary, white-hued star in the zodiac constellation of Pisces. It is faintly visible to the naked eye, having an apparent visual magnitude of +4.75. Based upon an annual parallax shift of 10.59 mas as seen from Earth, it is located about 308 light years from the Sun. The star is drifting further away with a heliocentric radial velocity of +6 km/s.

This is an ordinary A-type main sequence star with a stellar classification of A3 V. It is 461 million years old – about 98% of the way through its main sequence lifetime – and is spinning with a projected rotational velocity of 91 km/s. The star has 2.2 times the mass of the Sun, about 4.4 times the Sun's radius, and is radiating 107 times the Sun's luminosity from its photosphere at an effective temperature of 8,892 K.

== Naming ==
υ Piscium is the Bayer designation for this star, which is Latinized as Upsilon Piscium. It has the Flamsteed designation 90 Piscium.

In Chinese, 奎宿 (Kuí Sù), meaning Legs (asterism), refers to an asterism composed of υ Piscium, η Andromedae, 65 Piscium, ζ Andromedae, ε Andromedae, δ Andromedae, π Andromedae, ν Andromedae, μ Andromedae, β Andromedae, σ Piscium, τ Piscium, 91 Piscium, φ Piscium, χ Piscium and ψ¹ Piscium. Consequently, the Chinese name for υ Piscium itself is 奎宿十三 (Kuí Sù shí sān, English: the Thirteenth Star of Legs.)
