= Chi Piscium =

Yellow-hued giant star in the constellation Pisces

- Location of χ Piscium (circled)

Observation data Epoch J2000.0 Equinox J2000.0 (ICRS)
- Constellation: Pisces
- Right ascension: 01^{h} 11^{m} 27.21877^{s}
- Declination: +21° 02′ 04.7406″
- Apparent magnitude (V): +4.64

Characteristics
- Evolutionary stage: red clump
- Spectral type: G8.5 III
- U−B color index: +0.83
- B−V color index: +1.02

Astrometry
| Radial velocity (R_{v}) | +15.04±0.21 km/s |
| Proper motion (μ) | RA: +39.32 mas/yr Dec.: −10.48 mas/yr |
| Parallax (π) | 8.50±0.21 mas |
| Distance | 384 ± 9 ly (118 ± 3 pc) |
| Absolute magnitude (M_{V}) | −1.13 |

Details
| Mass | 3.17±0.23 M_{☉} |
| Radius | 15.75±0.97 R_{☉} |
| Luminosity | 209.2±10.5 L_{☉} |
| Surface gravity (log g) | 2.33±0.05 cgs |
| Temperature | 4,835±28 K |
| Metallicity [Fe/H] | −0.15±0.10 dex |
| Rotational velocity (v sin i) | 10 km/s |
| Age | 380±100 Myr |

Other designations
- χ Psc, 84 Piscium, BD+20°172, FK5 1032, HD 7087, HIP 5571, HR 351, SAO 74544

Database references
| SIMBAD | data |

Chi Piscium (χ Piscium) is a solitary, orange-hued star in the zodiac constellation of Pisces. It can be seen with the naked eye, having an apparent visual magnitude of +4.64. Based upon an annual parallax shift of 8.50 mas as seen from Earth, it is located about 384 light years from the Sun.

This is an evolved G-type giant star with a stellar classification of G8.5 III. There is a 94% chance that it is on the horizontal branch and is a red clump star, which means it is generating energy through helium fusion at its core. Chi Piscium is estimated to have 3.17 times the mass of the Sun, nearly 16 times the solar radius, and shines with 192.6 times the Sun's luminosity. It is around 380 million years old.

== Naming ==
In Chinese, 奎宿 (Kuí Sù), meaning Legs (asterism), refers to an asterism consisting of χ Piscium, η Andromedae, 65 Piscium, ζ Andromedae, ε Andromedae, δ Andromedae, π Andromedae, ν Andromedae, μ Andromedae, β Andromedae, σ Piscium, τ Piscium, 91 Piscium, υ Piscium, φ Piscium and ψ¹ Piscium. Consequently, the Chinese name for χ Piscium itself is 奎宿十五 (Kuí Sù shíwǔ, English: the Fifteenth Star of Legs.)
