= HD 2454 =

Probable binary star system in the constellation Pisces

Observation data Epoch J2000.0 Equinox ICRS
- Constellation: Pisces
- Right ascension: 00^{h} 28^{m} 20.042^{s}
- Declination: +10° 11′ 23.30″
- Apparent magnitude (V): 6.04

Characteristics
- Evolutionary stage: main sequence
- Spectral type: F5 V Sr
- B−V color index: +0.447±0.005

Astrometry
Radial velocity (R_{v})	−9.9±0.2 km/s
Proper motion (μ)	RA: +42.022 mas/yr Dec.: −180.181 mas/yr
Parallax (π)	26.2526±0.057 mas
Distance	124.2 ± 0.3 ly (38.09 ± 0.08 pc)
Absolute magnitude (M_{V})	3.24±0.03

Orbit
Primary	A
Name	B
Period (P)	80±21 years
Semi-major axis (a)	22±4 AU
Eccentricity (e)	0.59±0.04
Inclination (i)	34±6°
Longitude of the node (Ω)	11±165°
Periastron epoch (T)	2458626±173 BJD
Argument of periastron (ω) (secondary)	313±19°

Details

A
Mass	1.23 M_{☉}
Radius	1.6±0.1 R_{☉}
Luminosity	4.59 L_{☉}
Surface gravity (log g)	0.14±4.22 cgs
Temperature	6,508±221 K
Metallicity [Fe/H]	−0.32 dex
Rotation	3 days
Age	1.9 Gyr

B
Mass	0.50±0.09 M_{☉}

Other designations
- 88 G. Piscium, BD+09°47, FK5 2028, HD 2454, HIP 2235, HR 107, SAO 109224

Database references
SIMBAD	data

HD 2454 is a binary star system in the zodiac constellation of Pisces. With an apparent visual magnitude of 6.04, it is near the lower limit of visibility to the naked eye under good seeing conditions. An annual parallax shift of 26.3 mas as measured from Earth's orbit provides a distance estimate of 124 light years. It has a relatively high proper motion, traversing the celestial sphere at a rate of 0.208 arcseconds per year, and is moving closer to the Sun with a heliocentric radial velocity of −10 km/s.

The primary component of this system is an F-type main-sequence star with a stellar classification of F5 V Sr, showing an abnormally strong line of singly-ionized strontium (Sr II) at a wavelength of 4077 Å. It has an estimated 1.23 times the mass of the Sun and 1.6 times the Sun's radius. The star is about 1.9 billion years old with a rotation period of around three days. It is radiating 4.6 times the Sun's luminosity from its photosphere at an effective temperature of around 6,508 K.

The secondary is a white dwarf with half the Sun's mass. Both stellar components complete an orbit around their center of mass every 80 years and are on a rather eccentric orbit, with e = 0.59. The semi-major axis is of 22 astronomical units.

HD 2454 was the first star to be identified as a barium dwarf, by Tomkin et al. (1989). It displays a mild overabundance of the element barium, which has been accreted when the secondary was passing through the asymptotic giant branch (AGB) stage.

The visible component displays significant overabundances of three s-process peak elements that are generated during the RGB phase, as well as a mild overabundance of carbon. In contrast, it shows severe depletion of lithium and beryllium, as well as a notable underabundance of boron. The surface abundances of these lighter elements may have been altered during the mass transfer process, having been previously consumed in the core region of the companion.
