= Tau Piscium =

Orange-hued star in the constellation Pisces

- Location of τ Piscium (circled)

Observation data Epoch J2000.0 Equinox J2000.0 (ICRS)
- Constellation: Pisces
- Right ascension: 01^{h} 11^{m} 39.63647^{s}
- Declination: +30° 05′ 22.6909″
- Apparent magnitude (V): +4.518

Characteristics
- Evolutionary stage: red clump
- Spectral type: K0.5 IIIb
- U−B color index: +1.016
- B−V color index: +1.094

Astrometry
Radial velocity (R_{v})	36.36±0.34 km/s
Proper motion (μ)	RA: +73.88 mas/yr Dec.: −38.30 mas/yr
Parallax (π)	19.32±0.24 mas
Distance	169 ± 2 ly (51.8 ± 0.6 pc)
Absolute magnitude (M_{V})	+1.033

Details
Mass	1.69 M_{☉}
Radius	10 R_{☉}
Luminosity	44.7 L_{☉}
Surface gravity (log g)	2.6 cgs
Temperature	4,624±5 K
Metallicity [Fe/H]	−0.04 dex
Rotational velocity (v sin i)	2.2 km/s
Age	2.27 Gyr

Other designations
- τ Psc, 83 Piscium, BD+29°190, FK5 43, HD 7106, HIP 5586, HR 352, SAO 74546

Database references
SIMBAD	data

Tau Piscium (τ Piscium) is an orange-hued star in the zodiac constellation of Pisces. With an apparent visual magnitude of +4.52, it is a dim star but visible to the naked eye. Based upon an annual parallax shift of 19.32 mas as seen from Earth, it is located around 169 light years from the Sun. It is most likely (96% chance) a member of the thin disk population.

This is an evolved K-type giant star with a stellar classification of K0.5 IIIb. It is about 2.27 billion years and is a red clump star on the horizontal branch, which indicates it is generating energy through helium fusion at its core. The star has 1.7 times the mass of the Sun and has expanded to about 10 times the Sun's radius. It is radiating 45 times the Sun's luminosity from its photosphere at an effective temperature of 4,624 K.

== Naming ==
In Chinese, 奎宿 (Kuí Sù), meaning Legs, refers to an asterism consisting of τ Piscium, η Andromedae, 65 Piscium, ζ Andromedae, ε Andromedae, δ Andromedae, π Andromedae, ν Andromedae, μ Andromedae, β Andromedae, σ Piscium, 91 Piscium, υ Piscium, φ Piscium, χ Piscium and ψ¹ Piscium. Consequently, the Chinese name for τ Piscium itself is 奎宿十一 (Kuí Sù shíyī, English: the Eleventh Star of Legs.)
