= 35 Piscium =

Star in the constellation Pisces

- Location of 35 Piscium (circled in red)

Observation data Epoch J2000.0 Equinox ICRS
- Constellation: Pisces
- Right ascension: 00^{h} 14^{m} 58.84021^{s}
- Declination: +08° 49′ 15.4739″
- Apparent magnitude (V): 5.88 (6.10 + ? + 7.72)

Characteristics
- Spectral type: F0IV + F0: + F
- Variable type: ELL/DW:

Astrometry
| Radial velocity (R_{v}) | 0.9±0.9 km/s |
| Proper motion (μ) | RA: +99.42 mas/yr Dec.: −23.62 mas/yr |
| Parallax (π) | 12.86±1.05 mas |
| Distance | 250 ± 20 ly (78 ± 6 pc) |

Other designations
- 35 Psc, UU Psc, BD+08°19, GC 287, HD 1061, HIP 1196, HR 50, SAO 109087, WDS J00150+0849A

Database references
| SIMBAD | data |

35 Piscium is a triple star system in the northern constellation Pisces, located about 250 light years away from the Sun. Because it is a variable star, it has been given the variable star designation UU Piscium; 35 Piscium is the Flamsteed designation. This system is faintly visible to the naked eye with a combined apparent visual magnitude of 5.88. It is catalogued as a member of the IC 2391 supercluster by Olin J. Eggen.

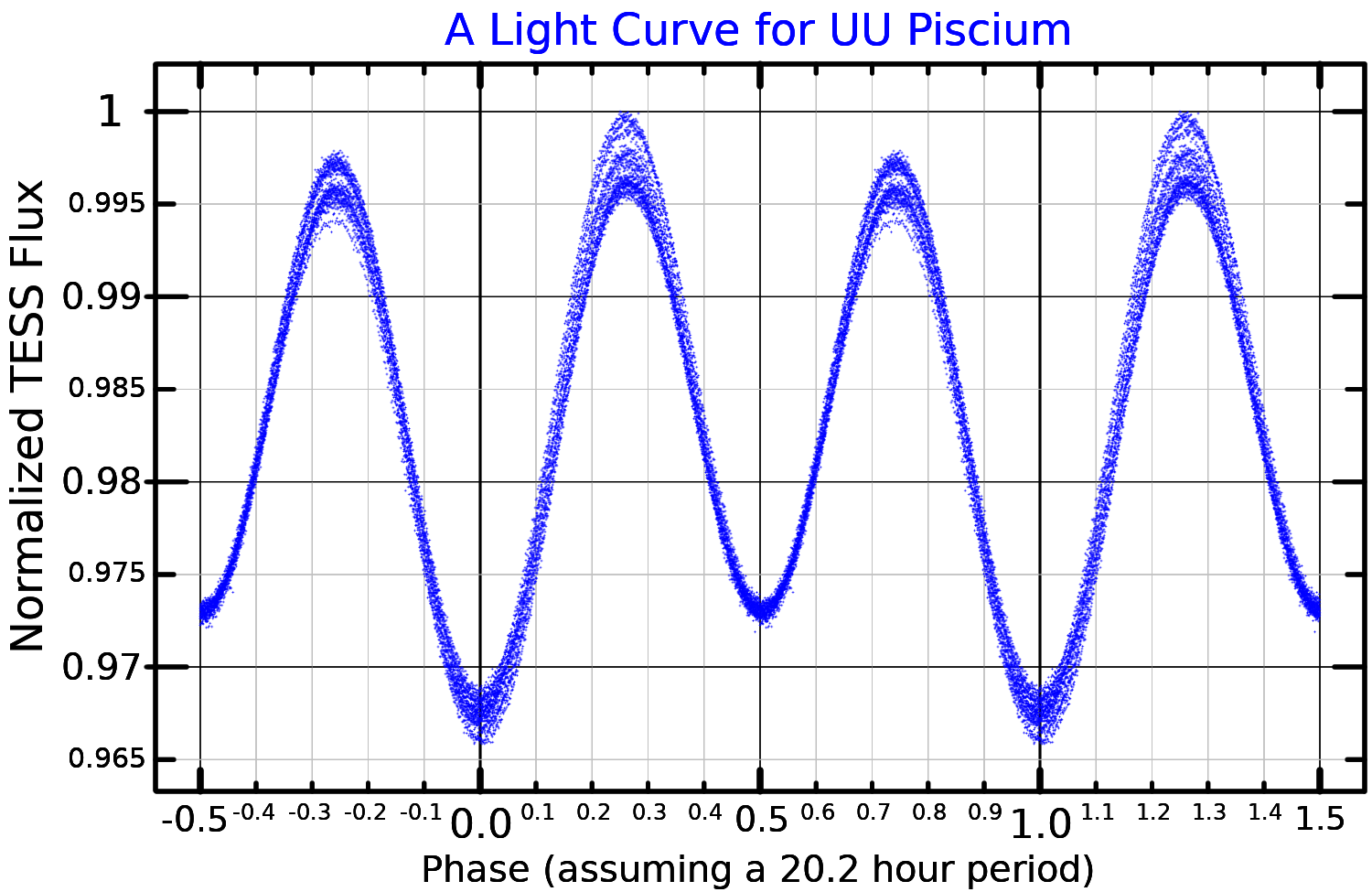
A light curve for UU Piscium, plotted from TESS data

In the past the inner pair, designated component A, has been described as an eclipsing binary system, showing a primary minimum of 6.05 and a secondary minimum of 6.04. They have an orbital period of 0.841658 days, zero eccentricity, and an inclination of 19 degrees. However, Bruno Cester argued that the apparent eclipses are not real, and were caused by seeing different portions of distorted-shaped stars in a near contact binary system. As of 2017, it is classified as a rotating ellipsoidal variable and possibly a W Ursae Majoris-type system, although not in physical contact. The components of this pair appear to be equal, with stellar classifications of F0 V or F0 IV.

The magnitude 7.72 tertiary member, designated component B, lies at an angular separation of 11.464″ from the main pair.
