= 101 Piscium =

Blue giant star in the constellation Pisces

Observation data Epoch J2000.0 Equinox J2000.0 (ICRS)
- Constellation: Pisces
- Right ascension: 01^{h} 35^{m} 46.44226^{s}
- Declination: +14° 39′ 41.1144″
- Apparent magnitude (V): 6.23

Characteristics
- Spectral type: B9.5 III
- U−B color index: −0.151
- B−V color index: −0.036±0.005

Astrometry
Radial velocity (R_{v})	−10.10 km/s
Proper motion (μ)	RA: +3.287 mas/yr Dec.: −8.052 mas/yr
Parallax (π)	2.3343±0.0663 mas
Distance	1,400 ± 40 ly (430 ± 10 pc)
Absolute magnitude (M_{V})	−2.07

Details
Mass	4.53±0.51 M_{☉}
Radius	3.6 R_{☉}
Luminosity	1,037+523 −347 L_{☉}
Surface gravity (log g)	2.907±0.028 cgs
Temperature	10,471+49 −48 K
Rotational velocity (v sin i)	246 km/s

Other designations
- 101 Psc, NSV 559, BD+13° 240, GC 1929, HD 9766, HIP 7436, HR 455, SAO 92530

Database references
SIMBAD	data

101 Piscium is a star in the zodiac constellation of Pisces, located around 1,400 light years away from the Sun. This appears as a dim, blue-white hued star near the lower limit of visibility to the naked eye at an apparent visual magnitude of 6.23. It is a suspected variable star with the designation NSV 559; 101 Piscium is the Flamsteed designation. The star is moving closer to the Earth with a heliocentric radial velocity of −10 km/s.

This object has a stellar classification of B9.5 III, matching a giant star that has consumed the hydrogen at its core and is evolving away from the main sequence. It is spinning rapidly with a projected rotational velocity of 246 km/s, compared to a critical velocity of 270 km/s. The star has 4.5 times the mass of the Sun and about 3.6 times the Sun's radius. It is radiating around 1,000 times the luminosity of the Sun from its photosphere at an effective temperature of 10,471 K.
