= HR 515 =

Star in the constellation Pisces

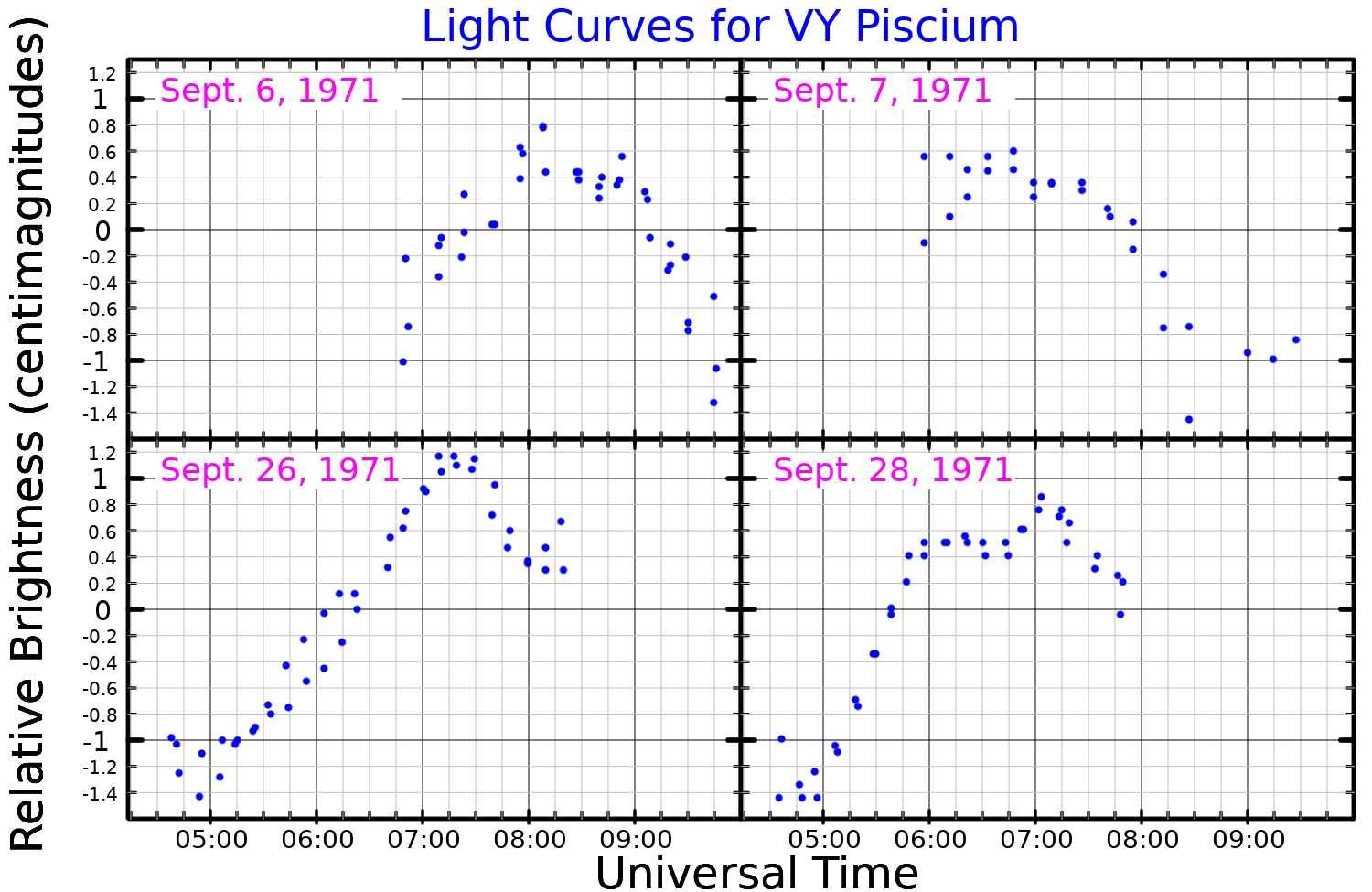
- Light curves for VY Piscium, adapted from Valtier et al. (1974). The vertical scale is hundredths of a magnitude.

Observation data Epoch J2000 Equinox ICRS
- Constellation: Pisces
- Right ascension: 01^{h} 46^{m} 35.29855^{s}
- Declination: +17° 24′ 45.7125″
- Apparent magnitude (V): 6.54 - 6.59

Characteristics
- Spectral type: A8 III or F0V
- B−V color index: 0.256±0.010
- Variable type: δ Sct

Astrometry
Radial velocity (R_{v})	−1.0±4.4 km/s
Proper motion (μ)	RA: +49.315 mas/yr Dec.: +3.096 mas/yr
Parallax (π)	6.4827±0.1220 mas
Distance	503 ± 9 ly (154 ± 3 pc)
Absolute magnitude (M_{V})	+0.84

Details
Mass	1.7 M_{☉}
Radius	4.7 R_{☉}
Luminosity	60 L_{☉}
Surface gravity (log g)	3.32 cgs
Temperature	7,401 K
Metallicity [Fe/H]	−0.02 dex
Rotational velocity (v sin i)	96 km/s
Age	944 Myr

Other designations
- 3 Arietis, VY Psc, BD+16°196, HD 10845, HIP 8271, HR 515, SAO 92622

Database references
SIMBAD	data

HR 515 is a variable star in the zodiac constellation of Pisces, near the eastern constellation border with Aries. Before the constellation borders were officially set, it held the Flamsteed designation of 3 Arietis, abbreviated 3 Ari). This star has the variable star designation VY Piscium, or VY Psc for short. It is a white-hued star that is near the lower limit of visibility to the naked eye with an apparent visual magnitude that ranges from 6.54 down to 6.59. Parallax measurements provide a distance estimate of approximately 503 light years from the Sun.

Gray and associates (1989) found a stellar classification of A8 III for this object, matching an evolved A-type giant star. Abt and Morrell (1995) listed a class of F0V, suggesting it is an F-type main-sequence star. It is a Delta Scuti variable whose brightness varies between magnitudes 6.54 and 6.59 with a period of 0.219 days. The star shows a high rate of spin with a projected rotational velocity of 96 km/s. It has 4.7 times the size of the Sun and is radiating 60 times the Sun's luminosity from its photosphere at an effective temperature of 7,401 K.
