= 77 Piscium =

Star system in the constellation Pisces

Observation data Epoch J2000.0 Equinox ICRS
- Constellation: Pisces
- A
- Right ascension: 01^{h} 05^{m} 49.23^{s}
- Declination: +04° 54′ 30.2″
- Apparent magnitude (V): 6.39
- Ba
- Right ascension: 01^{h} 05^{m} 51.43^{s}
- Declination: +04° 54′ 33.9″
- Apparent magnitude (V): 7.20±0.01
- Bb
- Right ascension: 01^{h} 05^{m} 51.37^{s}
- Declination: +04° 54′ 33.5″
- Apparent magnitude (V): 8.89±0.02

Characteristics

A
- Evolutionary stage: main sequence
- Spectral type: F5V
- B−V color index: 0.383±0.009

B
- Evolutionary stage: main sequence
- Spectral type: F5-7V
- B−V color index: 0.484±0.008

Astrometry

A
Radial velocity (R_{v})	−7.59±0.19 km/s
Proper motion (μ)	RA: 34.533±0.058 mas/yr Dec.: −126.163±0.037 mas/yr
Parallax (π)	22.5346±0.0487 mas
Distance	144.7 ± 0.3 ly (44.38 ± 0.10 pc)
Absolute magnitude (M_{V})	+3.31

B
Radial velocity (R_{v})	−7.19±0.14 km/s
Proper motion (μ)	RA: 24.106±0.030 mas/yr Dec.: −117.494±0.021 mas/yr
Parallax (π)	22.6816±0.0276 mas
Distance	143.8 ± 0.2 ly (44.09 ± 0.05 pc)
Absolute magnitude (M_{V})	+4.10

Details

A
Mass	1.381+0.061 −0.062 M_{☉}
Radius	1.63+0.99 −0.10 R_{☉}
Luminosity	4.71+0.99 −0.19 L_{☉}
Surface gravity (log g)	4.00+0.67 −0.45 cgs
Temperature	6,635+849 −502 K
Metallicity [Fe/H]	−0.92+0.79 −0.21 dex
Rotational velocity (v sin i)	23.0 km/s
Age	2.05+1.10 −0.20 Gyr

Ba
Mass	1.158+0.167 −0.168 M_{☉}
Radius	1.23+0.70 −0.42 R_{☉}
Luminosity	2.01+0.63 −0.43 L_{☉}
Surface gravity (log g)	4.20+0.09 −0.05 cgs
Temperature	6,203+839 −604 K
Metallicity [Fe/H]	−0.61+0.40 −0.21 dex
Rotational velocity (v sin i)	8.0 km/s
Age	2.80+0.11 −0.06 Gyr

Bb
Mass	0.62 M_{☉}

Other designations
- 77 Psc, CCDM J01058+0455, WDS J01058+0455
- A: BD+04°175, HD 6749, HIP 5141, HR 313, SAO 109666, TYC 22-1278-1
- B: BD+04°176, HD 6480, HIP 5144, HR 314, SAO 10966

Database references
SIMBAD	data
- A
- B

77 Piscium is a multiple star system in the constellation of Pisces. The star system is located at a distance of 144 and 143 light years from the Earth based on parallax, but is drifting closer with a heliocentric radial velocity of −7.59 and −7.19 km/s.
