= 7 Piscium =

Star in the constellation Pisces

Observation data Epoch J2000.0 Equinox ICRS
- Constellation: Pisces
- Right ascension: 23^{h} 20^{m} 20.58306^{s}
- Declination: +05° 22′ 52.7000″
- Apparent magnitude (V): 5.069

Characteristics
- Evolutionary stage: red clump
- Spectral type: K1 IV
- U−B color index: +1.12
- B−V color index: +1.204±0.002

Astrometry
Radial velocity (R_{v})	40.46±0.18 km/s
Proper motion (μ)	RA: 78.829 mas/yr Dec.: −59.228 mas/yr
Parallax (π)	9.5042±0.1880 mas
Distance	343 ± 7 ly (105 ± 2 pc)
Absolute magnitude (M_{V})	−0.56

Details
Mass	1.37 M_{☉}
Radius	22.06+1.38 −3.16 R_{☉}
Luminosity	163±4 L_{☉}
Surface gravity (log g)	1.81±0.28 cgs
Temperature	4,314±80 K
Metallicity [Fe/H]	−0.71±0.12 dex
Age	4.58 Gyr

Other designations
- b Piscium, 7 Psc, BD+04°4997, FK5 3871, HD 220009, HIP 115227, HR 8878, SAO 128126

Database references
SIMBAD	data

7 Piscium is a single star in the zodiac constellation of Pisces, located around 343 light-years away from the Sun. It has the Bayer designation b Piscium; 7 Piscium is the Flamsteed designation. This object is visible to the naked eye as a faint, orange-hued star with an apparent visual magnitude of 5.07. It is moving further from the Earth with a heliocentric radial velocity of 40 km/s.

This is a metal-deficient giant star with a stellar classification of K1 IV. It is a red clump giant, which indicates it is on the horizontal branch and is generating energy through the fusion of helium at its core. The star is 4.58 billion years old with 1.37 times the mass of the Sun. It has 22 times the Sun's radius and is radiating 163 times the Sun's luminosity from its enlarged photosphere at an effective temperature of 4,314 K.
