= 94 Piscium =

Star in the constellation Pisces

Observation data Epoch J2000 Equinox ICRS
- Constellation: Pisces
- Right ascension: 01^{h} 26^{m} 41.67906^{s}
- Declination: +19° 14′ 25.5356″
- Apparent magnitude (V): 5.495

Characteristics
- Evolutionary stage: red clump
- Spectral type: K1 III
- B−V color index: 1.106±0.005

Astrometry
Radial velocity (R_{v})	−42.53±0.09 km/s
Proper motion (μ)	RA: 51.382 mas/yr Dec.: −58.041 mas/yr
Parallax (π)	10.6874±0.1404 mas
Distance	305 ± 4 ly (94 ± 1 pc)
Absolute magnitude (M_{V})	0.84

Details
Mass	1.34 M_{☉}
Radius	12.8+0.1 −0.4 R_{☉}
Luminosity	68.759±1.058 L_{☉}
Surface gravity (log g)	2.45±0.10 cgs
Temperature	4,665±42 K
Metallicity [Fe/H]	−0.03±0.04 dex
Age	4.1 Gyr

Other designations
- BD+18°189, FK5 1039, HD 8763, HIP 6732, HR 414, SAO 92444

Database references
SIMBAD	data

94 Piscium is a single star in the zodiac constellation Pisces, located 305 light years away from the Sun. It is visible to the naked eye as a faint, orange-hued star with an apparent visual magnitude of 5.495. The object is moving closer to the Earth with a heliocentric radial velocity of −43 km/s. It is a possible member of the Wolf 630 moving group.

This is an evolved K-type giant star with a stellar classification of K1 III. It is a red clump giant, which indicates it is on the horizontal branch and is generating energy through helium fusion at its core. The star is 4.1 billion years old with 1.34 times the mass of the Sun and 13 times the Sun's radius. It is radiating 69 times the Sun's luminosity from its enlarged photosphere at an effective temperature of 4,665 K.
