= Psi1 Piscium =

Binary star in the constellation Pisces

ψ^{1} Piscium
- Location of ψ^{1} Piscium (circled)

Observation data Epoch J2000 Equinox ICRS
- Constellation: Pisecs
- ψ^{1} Psc A
- Right ascension: 01^{h} 05^{m} 40.95527^{s}
- Declination: +21° 28′ 23.4489″
- Apparent magnitude (V): 5.273
- ψ^{1} Psc B
- Right ascension: 01^{h} 05^{m} 41.71111^{s}
- Declination: +21° 27′ 55.6120″
- Apparent magnitude (V): 5.455

Characteristics

ψ^{1} Psc A
- Spectral type: A1V + A4V
- U−B color index: −0.12
- B−V color index: −0.04

ψ^{1} Psc B
- Evolutionary stage: main sequence
- Spectral type: A0Vn
- U−B color index: −0.17
- B−V color index: −0.06

Astrometry

ψ^{1} Psc A
Radial velocity (R_{v})	−3.90±2.9 km/s
Proper motion (μ)	RA: 44.49 mas/yr Dec.: −14.82 mas/yr
Parallax (π)	11.86±0.68 mas
Distance	280 ± 20 ly (84 ± 5 pc)
Absolute magnitude (M_{V})	+0.71

ψ^{1} Psc B
Radial velocity (R_{v})	−7.20±3.6 km/s
Proper motion (μ)	RA: 54.952 mas/yr Dec.: −15.938 mas/yr
Parallax (π)	11.3778±0.0506 mas
Distance	287 ± 1 ly (87.9 ± 0.4 pc)
Absolute magnitude (M_{V})	+0.89

Orbit
Primary	ψ^{1} Psc Aa
Name	ψ^{1} Psc Ab
Period (P)	14.44±0.26 yr
Semi-major axis (a)	114.3±1.7″
Eccentricity (e)	0.519±0.027
Inclination (i)	77.43±0.81°
Longitude of the node (Ω)	134.8±1.2°
Periastron epoch (T)	B 2007.512±0.041
Argument of periastron (ω) (secondary)	305.4±2.3°

Details

ψ^{1} Psc Aa
Mass	2.2 M_{☉}

ψ^{1} Psc Ab
Mass	1.7 M_{☉}

ψ^{1} Psc B
Mass	2.6 M_{☉}
Radius	2.2 R_{☉}
Luminosity	57 L_{☉}
Surface gravity (log g)	4.04 cgs
Temperature	10,694 K
Rotational velocity (v sin i)	250 km/s
Age	210 Myr

Other designations
- ψ^{1} Psc, 74 Psc, ADS 899 AB, CCDM J01057+2128
- ψ^{1} Psc A: BD+20°156, HD 6456, HIP 5131, HR 310, SAO 74482
- ψ^{1} Psc B: BD+20°157, HD 6457, HIP 5132, HR 311, SAO 74483

Database references
SIMBAD	ψ^{1} Psc A
- ψ^{1} Psc B

Psi^{1} Piscium (Psi^{1} Psc, ψ^{1} Piscium, ψ^{1} Psc) is a binary star in the constellation Pisces. It is approximately 280 light years from Earth, based on its parallax.

The two components of Psi^{1} Piscium are both A-type main-sequence stars. The primary has an apparent magnitude of 5.273, while the secondary is slightly dimmer, with an apparent magnitude of 5.455. The primary itself is a close binary, with two A-type stars that orbit each other every 14.44 years.

Psi^{1} Piscium is moving through the Galaxy at a speed of 22.5 km/s relative to the Sun. Its projected Galactic orbit carries it between 22,800 and 24,300 light years from the center of the Galaxy.

== Naming ==
In Chinese, 奎宿 (Kuí Sù), meaning Legs (asterism), refers to an asterism consisting of refers to an asterism consisting of ψ^{1} Piscium, η Andromedae, 65 Piscium, ζ Andromedae, ε Andromedae, δ Andromedae, π Andromedae, ν Andromedae, μ Andromedae, β Andromedae, τ Piscium, 91 Piscium, υ Piscium, φ Piscium and χ Piscium. Consequently, the Chinese name for ψ^{1} Piscium itself is 奎宿十六 (Kuí Sù shíliù, English: the Sixteenth Star of Legs.)
