= Psi3 Piscium =

Star in the constellation Pisces

Psi^{3} Piscium
- Location of ψ^{3} Piscium (circled)

Observation data Epoch J2000.0 Equinox J2000.0 (ICRS)
- Constellation: Pisces
- Right ascension: 01^{h} 09^{m} 49.20090^{s}
- Declination: +19° 39′ 30.2649″
- Apparent magnitude (V): 5.56

Characteristics
- Evolutionary stage: subgiant
- Spectral type: F9 IIIa or G0 IV
- B−V color index: −0.70

Astrometry
| Radial velocity (R_{v}) | −6.6±2.1 km/s |
| Proper motion (μ) | RA: −5.971 mas/yr Dec.: +9.170 mas/yr |
| Parallax (π) | 7.8074±0.0721 mas |
| Distance | 418 ± 4 ly (128 ± 1 pc) |
| Absolute magnitude (M_{V}) | +3.38 |

Details
| Mass | 2.69 M_{☉} |
| Radius | 10.1 R_{☉} |
| Luminosity | 87 L_{☉} |
| Surface gravity (log g) | 2.86 cgs |
| Temperature | 5,553 K |
| Metallicity [Fe/H] | +0.88±0.21 dex |
| Rotation | 11 d |
| Rotational velocity (v sin i) | 87.7±4.4 km/s |
| Age | 590 Myr |

Other designations
- ψ^{3} Psc, 81 Piscium, BD+18°153, HD 6903, HIP 5454, HR 339, SAO 92283

Database references
| SIMBAD | data |

Psi^{3} Piscium, which is Latinized from ψ^{3} Piscium, is a solitary, yellow-hued star in the zodiac constellation of Pisces. It is faintly visible to the naked eye, having an apparent visual magnitude of 5.56. Based upon an annual parallax shift of 7.8 mas as seen from Earth, it is located about 418 light years from the Sun. At that distance, the visual magnitude is diminished by an extinction factor of 0.33 due to interstellar dust. The star is drifting closer to the Sun with a radial velocity of −7 km/s.

This F-type subgiant star with a stellar classification of F9 IIIa or G0IV. It is an X-ray source with a luminosity of (0.82±0.13)×10^{30} erg s^{−1} in the 0.3−10 keV band. The projected rotational velocity is 87.7±4.4 km/s. It has 2.7 times the mass of the Sun and 10.1 times the Sun's radius. The star is radiating 87 times the luminosity of the Sun from its enlarged photosphere at an effective temperature of 5,553 K.
