= Psi2 Piscium =

Binary star system in the constellation Pisces

Psi^{2} Piscium
- Location of ψ^{2} Piscium (circled)

Observation data Epoch J2000.0 Equinox J2000.0 (ICRS)
- Constellation: Pisces
- Right ascension: 01^{h} 07^{m} 57.16387^{s}
- Declination: +20° 44′ 20.8310″
- Apparent magnitude (V): +5.56

Characteristics
- Evolutionary stage: main sequence
- Spectral type: A3 V
- B−V color index: +0.12

Astrometry
Radial velocity (R_{v})	−15.2±0.9 km/s
Proper motion (μ)	RA: +86.72 mas/yr Dec.: −82.75 mas/yr
Parallax (π)	21.14±0.77 mas
Distance	154 ± 6 ly (47 ± 2 pc)
Absolute magnitude (M_{V})	+2.19

Details
Mass	2.13 M_{☉}
Radius	1.74 R_{☉}
Luminosity	14 L_{☉}
Surface gravity (log g)	4.29 cgs
Temperature	8,537 K
Rotational velocity (v sin i)	149 km/s
Age	250 Myr

Other designations
- ψ^{2} Psc, 79 Piscium, BD+19°185, HD 6695, HIP 5310, HR 328, SAO 74506

Database references
SIMBAD	data

Psi^{2} Piscium (ψ^{2} Piscium) is a white-hued star in the zodiac constellation of Pisces. It is faintly visible to the naked eye, having an apparent visual magnitude of +5.56. Based upon an annual parallax shift of 8.66 mas as seen from Earth, it is located about 380 light years from the Sun. It has a peculiar velocity of 14.6±2.9 km/s, indicating it is a runaway star.

This is a suspected binary star system, with a companion star at an angular separation of 0.357±0.002 arc seconds along a position angle of 174.99°±0.30° from the primary, as of 2008. This corresponds to a projected separation of 16.88±0.62 AU. The brighter component is an A-type main sequence star with a stellar classification of A3 V. The system is a source of X-ray emission with a luminosity of 143.9×10^{20} W, which is most likely originating from the cooler companion since A-type main sequence stars are not expected to be magnetically active.
