= List of white dwarfs =

This is a list of exceptional white dwarf stars.

== Firsts ==
These were the first white dwarfs discovered fitting these conditions

| Title | Star | Date | Data | Comments | Notes | Refs |
|---|---|---|---|---|---|---|
| First discovered | 40 Eridani B | 1783 | | | | |
| First found in a binary star system | 40 Eridani B | 1783 | | | | |
| First double white dwarf system | LDS 275 | 1944 | L 462-56 system | | | |
| First solitary white dwarf | Van Maanen 2 | 1917 | | Van Maanen's star is also the nearest solitary white dwarf | | |
| First white dwarf with a planet | WD B1620−26 | 2003 | PSR B1620-26 b (planet) | This planet is a circumbinary planet, which circles both stars in the PSR B1620-26 system | | |
| First singular white dwarf with a transiting object | WD 1145+017 | 2015 | | Known object is a disintegrating planetesimal, most likely an asteroid. | | |
| First white dwarf that is a pulsar | AR Scorpii A | 2016 | | The star is in a binary system with a red dwarf | | |

== Extremes ==
These are the white dwarfs which are currently known to fit these conditions

| Title | Star | Date | Data | Comments | Notes | Refs |
|---|---|---|---|---|---|---|
| Nearest | Sirius | 1852 | 8.6 ly (2.6 pc) | Sirius B is also the second white dwarf discovered. | See also: § Nearest | |
| Farthest | SN UDS10Wil progenitor | 2013 | 10,000,000,000 ly z=1.914 | SN Wilson is a type-Ia supernova whose progenitor was a white dwarf | | |
| Oldest | WD 0346+246 | 2021 | 11.5 billion years | | | |
| Youngest | | | | | | |
| Highest surface temperature | RX J0439.8−6809 | 2015 | 250,000 K (250,000 °C; 450,000 °F) | This star is located in the Milky Way's galactic halo, in the field of the Large Magellanic Cloud | | |
| Lowest surface temperature | LSPM J1403+4533 | 2018 | 2,895 K (2,622 °C; 4,751 °F) | | | |
| Most luminous | Central star of the Skull Nebula | 2018 | 18,600+7,600 −11,000 L_{☉} | | | |
| Least luminous | WD 2058+342 | | 6.6×10^{−6} L_{☉} | | | |
| Brightest apparent | Sirius B | 1852 | 8.44 (V) | | | |
| Dimmest apparent | | | | | | |
| Most massive | ZTF J1901+1458 | 2020 | 1.35 M_{☉} | | | |
| Least massive | CR Boötis B | 2022 | 0.07 M_{☉} | In a tight 24 minute binary. | | |
| Largest | Z Andromedae B | | 0.17—0.36 R_{☉} | | | |
| Smallest | HD 49798 | 2021 | 0.0023 R_{☉} | | | |

== Nearest ==
10 nearest white dwarfs
| Star | Distance | Comments | Notes | Refs |
|---|---|---|---|---|
| Sirius B | 8.58 ly (2.63 pc) | Sirius B is also the second white dwarf discovered. It is part of the Sirius system. | | |
| Procyon B | 11.43 ly (3.50 pc) | Part of Procyon system | | |
| van Maanen's Star | 14.04 ly (4.30 pc) | | | |
| GJ 440 | 15.09 ly (4.63 pc) | | | |
| 40 Eridani B | 16.25 ly (4.98 pc) | Part of 40 Eridani system | | |
| Stein 2051 B | 18.06 ly (5.54 pc) | Part of Stein 2051 system | | |
| LP 44-113 | 20.0 ly (6.1 pc) | | | |
| G 99-44 | 20.9 ly (6.4 pc) | | | |
| L 97-12 | 25.8 ly (7.9 pc) | | | |
| Wolf 489 | 26.7 ly (8.2 pc) | | | |

== Other notable white dwarfs ==
- SDSS J1228+1040, a white dwarf with a disk of debris.
- ZTF J203349.8+322901.1, a white dwarf with one side made up of hydrogen and the other of helium, nicknamed Janus
- WD J1330+6435, the first known star with a greenish hue.

== See also ==
- Lists of astronomical objects
- Lists of stars
- List of exoplanets and planetary debris around white dwarfs
