= List of star systems within 20–25 light-years =

This is a list of star systems within 20–25 light years of Earth. So far, 84 such objects have been found, of which only 7 are bright enough to be visible without a telescope.

== List ==
Key
#	Visible to the unaided eye
$	Bright star (absolute magnitude of +8.5 or brighter)
‡	White dwarf
§	Brown dwarf or sub-brown dwarf
*	Nearest in constellation

System	Star or (sub-) brown dwarf	Distance (ly)	Constellation	Coordinates: RA, Dec (Ep J2000, Eq J2000)	Stellar class	Apparent magnitude (V)	Parallax (mas)	Notes and additional references
Gliese 784 (HD 191849)		20.1062±0.0028	Telescopium	20^{h} 13^{m} 53.4^{s} −45° 09′ 50″	M0V	7.97	162.2171±0.0225	has 1 candidate planet
WISE J2209+2711§		20.17±0.25	Pegasus*	22^{h} 09^{m} 05.7^{s} +27° 11′ 44″	Y0		161.7±2.0	
G 240-72 (LHS 455, GJ 1221, EGGR 372)‡		20.2588±0.0015	Draco	17^{h} 48^{m} 08.2^{s} +70° 52′ 35″	DXP9	14.22	160.9952±0.0119	
Gliese 555 (Wolf 1481, HN Librae, BD-11 3759)		20.3947±0.0070	Libra	14^{h} 34^{m} 16.8^{s} −12° 31′ 10″	M4.0V	10.3–10.33	159.9225±0.0546	BY Draconis variable; has 1 known planet, 1 candidate
EQ Pegasi (Gliese 896, BD+19 5116)	A	20.4277±0.0044	Pegasus	23^{h} 31^{m} 52.2^{s} +19° 56′ 14″	M3.5V	10.35	159.6634±0.0341	both components are flare stars; has 1 known planet orbiting star A of the binary system
EQ Pegasi (Gliese 896, BD+19 5116)	B	20.4277±0.0044	Pegasus	23^{h} 31^{m} 52.2^{s} +19° 56′ 14″	M4.5V	12.4	159.6634±0.0341	both components are flare stars; has 1 known planet orbiting star A of the binary system
Gliese 581 (Wolf 562, HO Librae)		20.5494±0.0039	Libra	15^{h} 19^{m} 26.8^{s} −07° 43′ 20″	M3.0V	10.56–10.58	158.7183±0.0301	BY Draconis variable; has 3 known planets
WISE 1405+5534§		20.62±0.34	Ursa Major	14^{h} 05^{m} 18.3^{s} +55° 34′ 21″	Y0.5		158.2±2.6	
ADS 7251 (HD 79210, Gliese 338, MCC 541)	A	20.6575±0.0026	Ursa Major	09^{h} 14^{m} 22.8^{s} +52° 41′ 12″	M0V	7.64	157.8879±0.0197	has 1 known planet orbiting star B of the binary system
ADS 7251 (HD 79210, Gliese 338, MCC 541)	B	20.6575±0.0026	Ursa Major	09^{h} 14^{m} 22.8^{s} +52° 41′ 12″	K7V	7.70	157.8879±0.0197	has 1 known planet orbiting star B of the binary system
LHS 2090 (LP 368-128)		20.7388±0.0071	Cancer	09^{h} 00^{m} 23.6^{s} +21° 50′ 05″	M6.5V	16.10	157.2686±0.0535	
Furuhjelm 46 (HD 155876, Gliese 661)	A	20.82±0.18	Hercules	17^{h} 12^{m} 07.9^{s} +45° 39′ 57″	M3 V	9.93	156.66±1.37	
Furuhjelm 46 (HD 155876, Gliese 661)	B	20.82±0.18	Hercules	17^{h} 12^{m} 07.9^{s} +45° 39′ 57″	M3.5 V	10.35	156.66±1.37	
2MASS 1503+2525§		20.94±0.10	Boötes	15^{h} 03^{m} 19.6^{s} +25° 25′ 20″	T5.5		155.7758±0.7557	
LP 944-20§		20.9615±0.0070	Fornax*	03^{h} 39^{m} 35.2^{s} –35° 25′ 44″	M9V	18.69	155.5982±0.0522	
LP 658-2 (EGGR 45)‡		21.0102±0.0024	Orion	05^{h} 55^{m} 09.5^{s} −04° 10′ 07″	DZ11	14.45	155.2373±0.0175	
GL Virginis (G 12-30)		21.0832±0.0061	Virgo	12^{h} 18^{m} 59.4^{s} +11° 07′ 34″	M5Ve	13.79	154.6999±0.0445	flare star
Gliese 625 (AC 54 1646-56, G 202-48)		21.1309±0.0022	Draco	16^{h} 25^{m} 24.6^{s} +54° 18′ 15″	M2.0V	10.17	154.3503±0.0161	has 1 known planet
V1054 Ophiuchi (HD 152751)	Gliese 644 A	21.1961±0.0065	Ophiuchus	16^{h} 55^{m} 25.2^{s} −08° 19′ 21″	M3 V	9.74	153.8754±0.0474	components Ab and Ac are flare stars
V1054 Ophiuchi (HD 152751)	Gliese 644 Ba	21.1961±0.0065	Ophiuchus	16^{h} 55^{m} 25.2^{s} −08° 19′ 21″	M4 Ve	10.34	153.8754±0.0474	components Ab and Ac are flare stars
V1054 Ophiuchi (HD 152751)	Gliese 644 Bb	21.1961±0.0065	Ophiuchus	16^{h} 55^{m} 25.2^{s} −08° 19′ 21″	M4 Ve	10.84	153.8754±0.0474	components Ab and Ac are flare stars
V1054 Ophiuchi (HD 152751)	Gliese 643	21.1961±0.0065	Ophiuchus	16^{h} 55^{m} 25.2^{s} −08° 19′ 21″	M3.5 V	11.74	153.8754±0.0474	components Ab and Ac are flare stars
V1054 Ophiuchi (HD 152751)	vB 8 (Gliese 644 C)	21.1961±0.0065	Ophiuchus	16^{h} 55^{m} 25.2^{s} −08° 19′ 21″	M7.0 V	16.80	153.8754±0.0474	components Ab and Ac are flare stars
GJ 1128 (L 100-115)		21.2121±0.0034	Carina	09^{h} 42^{m} 46.3^{s} −68° 53′ 06″	M4.0V	12.78	153.7593±0.0249	
HD 219134 (HR 8832, Gliese 892)$		21.3364±0.0069	Cassiopeia	23^{h} 13^{m} 17.0^{s} +57° 10′ 06″	K3V	5.574#	152.8640±0.0494	has 6 known planets
WISE 0825+2805§		21.37±0.28	Cancer	08^{h} 25^{m} 07.4^{s} +28° 05′ 49″	Y0.5		152.6±2.0	
WISE 0410+1502§		21.56±0.29	Taurus*	04^{h} 10^{m} 22.8^{s} +15° 02′ 47″	Y0		151.3±2.0	
WISE J0521+1025§		21.71±0.44	Orion	05^{h} 21^{m} 26.4^{s} +10° 25′ 27″	T7.5		150.2±3.0	
GJ 3737 (LHS 337, L 471-42)		21.7324±0.0047	Centaurus	12^{h} 38^{m} 49.1^{s} −38° 22′ 53″	M4.5V:	12.74	150.0781±0.0322	
Gliese 408 (Ross 104)		22.0081±0.0038	Leo	11^{h} 00^{m} 04.3^{s} +22° 49′ 59″	M3.0V	10.02	148.1986±0.0253	
Xi Boötis	A$	22.0109±0.0081	Boötes	14^{h} 51^{m} 23.4^{s} +19° 06′ 02″	G8Ve	4.70#	148.1793±0.0546	BY Draconis variable
Xi Boötis	B$	22.0109±0.0081	Boötes	14^{h} 51^{m} 23.4^{s} +19° 06′ 02″	K4Ve	6.97	148.1793±0.0546	BY Draconis variable
Gliese 299 (Ross 619)		22.079±0.014	Cancer	08^{h} 11^{m} 57.6^{s} +08° 46′ 22″	M4.5V	12.83	147.7218±0.0950	
GJ 3522 (G 41-14)	A	22.08±0.30	Cancer	08^{h} 58^{m} 56.3^{s} +08° 28′ 26″	M3.5V	10.92	147.66±1.98	
GJ 3522 (G 41-14)	B	22.08±0.30	Cancer	08^{h} 58^{m} 56.3^{s} +08° 28′ 26″	M	10.92	147.66±1.98	
GJ 3522 (G 41-14)	C	22.08±0.30	Cancer	08^{h} 58^{m} 56.3^{s} +08° 28′ 26″	M	10.92	147.66±1.98	
Gliese 829 (Ross 775)	A	22.1129±0.0039	Pegasus	21^{h} 29^{m} 36.8^{s} +17° 38′ 36″	M3+M	10.30	147.4958±0.0257	
Gliese 829 (Ross 775)	B	22.1129±0.0039	Pegasus	21^{h} 29^{m} 36.8^{s} +17° 38′ 36″	M	10.30	147.4958±0.0257	
Scholz's Star	A	22.17±0.18	Monoceros	07^{h} 20^{m} 03.3^{s} −08° 46′ 50″	M9.5	18.3	147.1±1.2	passed through the Solar System's Oort Cloud 70,000 years ago
Scholz's Star	B§	22.17±0.18	Monoceros	07^{h} 20^{m} 03.3^{s} −08° 46′ 50″	T5.5		147.1±1.2	passed through the Solar System's Oort Cloud 70,000 years ago
WISE 1928+2356§		22.28±0.18	Vulpecula*	19^{h} 28^{m} 41.5^{s} +23° 56′ 02″	T6		146.4067±1.2001	
WISE J0254+0223§		22.32±0.23	Cetus	02^{h} 54^{m} 09.6^{s} +02° 23′ 59″	T8		146.1±1.5	
LTT 1445 (BD-17 588)	A	22.3867±0.0037	Eridanus	03^{h} 01^{m} 51.4^{s} −16° 35′ 36″	M3.0	11.22	145.6922±0.0244	has 2-3 known planets orbiting star A
LTT 1445 (BD-17 588)	B	22.3867±0.0037	Eridanus	03^{h} 01^{m} 51.4^{s} −16° 35′ 36″	M3.5	11.37	145.6922±0.0244	has 2-3 known planets orbiting star A
LTT 1445 (BD-17 588)	C	22.3867±0.0037	Eridanus	03^{h} 01^{m} 51.4^{s} −16° 35′ 36″	M	11.37	145.6922±0.0244	has 2-3 known planets orbiting star A
Gliese 880 (HD 216899)		22.3973±0.0039	Pegasus	22^{h} 56^{m} 34.8^{s} +16° 33′ 12″	M2.0V	8.64	145.6234±0.0254	has 1 candidate planet
CWISE J1055+5443§		22.5^{+2.6}_{−2.0}	Ursa Major	10^{h} 55^{m} 12.1^{s} +54° 43′ 28″	Y0 (pec)		145.0±14.7	possibly a young low mass object (4−6 M_{J})
Gliese 402 (EE Leonis, Wolf 358)		22.7225±0.0045	Leo	10^{h} 50^{m} 52.0^{s} +06° 48′ 29.2″	M5.0V	11.68	143.5391±0.0286	BY Draconis variable; member of the Hercules-Lyra association
Gliese 393 (BD+01 2447)		22.9534±0.0034	Sextans	10^{h} 28^{m} 55.6^{s} +00° 50′ 28″	M2.5V	9.65	142.0951±0.0212	Member of the AB Doradus moving group; has 1 known planet
Gliese 809 (HD 199305)		22.9600±0.0026	Cepheus	20^{h} 53^{m} 19.8^{s} +62° 09′ 16″	M2.0V	8.60	142.0543±0.0160	
LSPM J2146+3813 (UCAC4 642-113039)		22.9858±0.0034	Cygnus	21^{h} 46^{m} 22.1^{s} +38° 13′ 05″	M5V		141.8946±0.0212	
LHS 3003 (GJ 3877, LP 914-54)		23.003±0.010	Hydra	14^{h} 56^{m} 38.3^{s} −28° 09′ 47″	M7.0V	17.14	141.7891±0.0617	
WISE 2056+1459§		23.16±0.33	Delphinus*	20^{h} 56^{m} 28.9^{s} +14° 59′ 54″	Y0		140.8±2.0	
GJ 1068 (L 230-188)		23.1816±0.0035	Dorado*	04^{h} 10^{m} 28.1^{s} −53° 36′ 08″	M4.5	13.58	140.6961±0.0214	
WISE J004945.61+215120.0§		23.23±0.35	Andromeda	00^{h} 49^{m} 45.6^{s} +21° 51′ 20″	T8.5		140.4±2.1	
GJ 1286 (G 157-77)		23.4074±0.0074	Pisces	23^{h} 35^{m} 10.5^{s} −02° 23′ 21″	M5.5V	14.69	139.3389±0.0441	
Gliese 105 (268 G. Ceti, HD 16160)	A$	23.5599±0.0071	Cetus	02^{h} 36^{m} 04.9^{s} +06° 53′ 13″	K3V	5.82#	138.4371±0.0420	star B is a BY Draconis variable
Gliese 105 (268 G. Ceti, HD 16160)	B	23.5599±0.0071	Cetus	02^{h} 36^{m} 04.9^{s} +06° 53′ 13″	M4.5V	11.66	138.4371±0.0420	star B is a BY Draconis variable
Gliese 105 (268 G. Ceti, HD 16160)	C	23.5599±0.0071	Cetus	02^{h} 36^{m} 04.9^{s} +06° 53′ 13″	M6V	16.9	138.4371±0.0420	star B is a BY Draconis variable
2MASS J08354256-0819237§		23.581±0.037	Hydra	08^{h} 35^{m} 42.6^{s} −08° 19′ 24″	L5		138.3147±0.2145	
GJ 4274 (L 788-34)		23.5955±0.0082	Aquarius	22^{h} 23^{m} 07.0^{s} −17° 36′ 26″	M4.5Ve	13.30	138.2280±0.0482	
Gliese 667 (142 G. Scorpii)	A$	23.6232±0.0048	Scorpius	17^{h} 18^{m} 57.2^{s} −34° 59′ 23″	K3V	7.07	138.0663±0.0283	star C has 2 known planets
Gliese 667 (142 G. Scorpii)	B$	23.6232±0.0048	Scorpius	17^{h} 18^{m} 57.2^{s} −34° 59′ 23″	K5V	8.02	138.0663±0.0283	star C has 2 known planets
Gliese 667 (142 G. Scorpii)	C	23.6232±0.0048	Scorpius	17^{h} 18^{m} 57.2^{s} −34° 59′ 23″	M1.5V	11.03	138.0663±0.0283	star C has 2 known planets
WISE 0607+2429§		23.624±0.089	Gemini	06^{h} 07^{m} 38.7^{s} +24° 29′ 54″	L8	14.22 ± 0.03 (J)	138.0616±0.5185	
WISE 0313+7807§		24.05±0.51	Cepheus	03^{h} 13^{m} 26.0^{s} +78° 07′ 44″	T8.5		135.6±2.8	
2MASS 1507-1627§		24.169±0.047	Libra	15^{h} 07^{m} 47.7^{s} −16° 27′ 389″	L5.5	22.14	134.9474±0.2611	
HD 4628 (96 G. Piscium, Gliese 33)$		24.250±0.010	Pisces	00^{h} 48^{m} 23.0^{s} +05° 16′ 50″	K2.5V	5.75#	134.4948±0.0578	
Beta Hydri$		24.327±0.020	Hydrus*	00^{h} 25^{m} 45.1^{s} –77° 15′ 15″	G2IV	2.79#	134.07±0.11	
WISE J2000+3629§		24.45±0.41	Cygnus	20^{h} 00^{m} 50.2^{s} +36° 29′ 50″	T8		133.4±2.2	
GJ 3991 (G 203-47)	A	24.784±0.081	Hercules	17^{h} 09^{m} 32.0^{s} +43° 40′ 49″	M3.5V	13.671	131.5996±0.4285	
GJ 3991 (G 203-47)	B	24.784±0.081	Hercules	17^{h} 09^{m} 32.0^{s} +43° 40′ 49″	D?		131.5996±0.4285	
Alpha Piscis Austrini	B (TW PsA)$	24.7929±0.0052	Piscis Austrinus	22^{h} 56^{m} 24.17^{s} −31° 33′ 56″	K5Vp	6.48#	131.5525±0.0275	component B of triple system
107 Piscium$		24.805±0.029	Pisces	01^{h} 42^{m} 29.8^{s} +20° 16′ 07″	K1V	5.24#	131.4903±0.1515	
G 141-36		24.8445±0.0075	Aquila	18^{h} 48^{m} 17.5^{s} +07° 41′ 21″	M6V		131.2790±0.0398	
Gliese 514 (BD+11 2576)		24.8782±0.0051	Virgo	13^{h} 29^{m} 59.8^{s} +10° 22′ 38″	M1.0V	9.02	131.1013±0.0270	has 1 known planet
WISE 1738+2732§		24.92±0.41	Hercules	17^{h} 38^{m} 35.5^{s} +27° 32′ 59″	Y0		130.9±2.1	
GJ 4053 (G 258-33)		24.9254±0.0041	Draco	18^{h} 18^{m} 57.2^{s} +66° 11′ 33″	M4.5V	13.46	130.8531±0.0217	
WISE J2354+0240§		24.97±0.65	Pisces	23^{h} 54^{m} 02.8^{s} +02° 40′ 14″	Y1		130.6±3.3	
System	Star or (sub-) brown dwarf	Distance (ly)	Constellation	Coordinates: RA, Dec (Ep J2000, Eq J2000)	Stellar class	Apparent magnitude (V)	Parallax (mas)	Notes and additional references

== See also ==
- List of nearest stars
- List of star systems within 25–30 light-years
- Lists of stars
- List of nearest bright stars
