= GJ 3991 =

Star in the constellation Hercules

Observation data Epoch J2000.0 Equinox ICRS
- Constellation: Hercules
- Right ascension: 17^{h} 09^{m} 31.544^{s}
- Declination: +43° 40′ 52.77″
- Apparent magnitude (V): 13.671

Characteristics
- Spectral type: M3.5V
- Apparent magnitude (B): 13.46
- Apparent magnitude (R): 11.511
- Apparent magnitude (J): 7.380
- Apparent magnitude (H): 6.76
- Apparent magnitude (K): 6.485

Astrometry
Radial velocity (R_{v})	−27.87 km/s
Proper motion (μ)	RA: +332.032 mas/yr Dec.: −274.501 mas/yr
Parallax (π)	131.5996±0.4285 mas
Distance	24.78 ± 0.08 ly (7.60 ± 0.02 pc)
Absolute magnitude (M_{V})	12.41

Orbit
Period (P)	14.909777±0.00001 days
Semi-major axis (a)	0.015+0.01 −0.05" (0.1102 AU)
Eccentricity (e)	0.068±0.004
Argument of periastron (ω) (primary)	175.0±3.0°
Semi-amplitude (K_{1}) (primary)	50.6±0.2 km/s

Details

GJ 3991 A
Mass	0.2714+0.0066 −0.0065 M_{☉}
Radius	0.286±0.011 R_{☉}
Luminosity	0.0085±0.0001 L_{☉}
Temperature	3279+65 −63 K

GJ 3991 B
Mass	≳0.5 M_{☉}
Surface gravity (log g)	8.0+1.00 −0.13 cgs
Temperature	5286+788 −91 K
Rotation	>100 days
Age	(as white dwarf) ~4 Gyr

Other designations
- GJ 3991, HIP 83945, G 203-47, WD 1708+437, USNO 752

Database references
SIMBAD	data
ARICNS	data

GJ 3991 (also known as Gliese 3991 and G 203-47) is a binary star system located 24.78 light-years (7.60 parsecs) away in the constellation Hercules. Due to their small separation, the two stars were initially detected from the radial velocity changes of GJ 3991, making the system a spectroscopic binary. It consists of a red dwarf star with 20–30% the mass of the Sun, and a white dwarf star roughly 50% the mass of the sun. The two components orbit each other in a tight orbit only 0.11 astronomical units from each other, with an orbital period of only 14.91 days. This system is the nearest example of a post-common-envelope binary.

== White dwarf ==
GJ 3991 B was first identified in 1997 by astronomers I. N. Reid and J. E. Gizis through significant radial velocity variations of GJ 3991 A, but they were unable to identify the nature of the secondary object. In 1998, another group of astronomers was able to determine the secondary as a cold white dwarf star, the compact remnant that remains after a low-mass star such as the Sun is no longer able to fuse elements for energy. It was directly detected for the first time, and spectroscopically confirmed as a white dwarf, in 2026. GJ 3991 B is the 9th nearest white dwarf, after Sirius B, Procyon B, Van Maanen 2, Gliese 440, 40 Eridani B, Stein 2051 B, G 240-72, and LP 658-2. Despite the close orbit of the white dwarf, it is not tidally locked, with a slow rotation period likely exceeding 100 days.

Some sources call the component stars A & B, while others call them Aa & Ab.

== See also ==
- List of star systems within 20–25 light-years
