= LP 658-2 =

White dwarf star in the constellation Orion

Observation data Epoch J2000.0 Equinox J2000.0 (ICRS)
- Constellation: Orion
- Right ascension: 05^{h} 55^{m} 09.53049^{s}
- Declination: −04° 10′ 07.0653″
- Apparent magnitude (V): 14.488

Characteristics
- Evolutionary stage: white dwarf
- Spectral type: DZ11.8
- Apparent magnitude (B): 15.49
- Apparent magnitude (V): 14.488
- Apparent magnitude (R_{KC}): 13.99
- Apparent magnitude (I_{KC}): 13.51
- Apparent magnitude (J): 13.05 ± 0.03
- Apparent magnitude (H): 12.86 ± 0.03
- Apparent magnitude (K_{S}): 12.78 ± 0.03
- B−V color index: 1.0

Astrometry
Proper motion (μ)	RA: 535.249 mas/yr Dec.: −2,317.011 mas/yr
Parallax (π)	155.2373±0.0175 mas
Distance	21.010 ± 0.002 ly (6.4418 ± 0.0007 pc)
Absolute magnitude (M_{V})	15.44 ± 0.03

Details

From Holberg etal. (2008)
Mass	0.45±0.01 M_{☉}
Radius	0.014 (Note: From surface gravity and mass.) R_{☉}
Surface gravity (log g)	7.80±0.02 cgs
Temperature	4,270±70, K
Age	6.42 (Note: White dwarf cooling age, i. e. age as degenerate star (not including lifetime as main sequence star and as giant star)) Gyr

Details

From Subasavage etal. (2009)
Mass	0.80±0.01 M_{☉}
Radius	0.010 R_{☉}
Surface gravity (log g)	8.35±0.01 cgs
Temperature	5,180±70 K
Age	6.82±0.02 Gyr

Other designations
- HL 4, GJ 223.2, GJ 9193, EGGR 45, G 99-44, G 106-12, LHS 32, LP 658-2, NLTT 15811, WD 0552-041

Database references
SIMBAD	data

LP 658-2 is a degenerate (white dwarf) star in the constellation of Orion, the single known object in its system. It has an apparent visual magnitude of approximately 14.488.

== Distance ==
According to a 2009 paper, it is the eighth closest known white dwarf to the Sun (after Sirius B, Procyon B, van Maanen's star, Gliese 440, 40 Eridani B, Stein 2051 B and GJ 1221). Its trigonometric parallax from the CTIOPI (Cerro Tololo Inter-American Observatory (CTIO) Parallax Investigation) 0.9 m telescope program, published in 2009, is 0.15613 ± 0.00084 arcsec, corresponding to a distance 6.40 ± 0.03 pc, or 20.89 ± 0.11 ly. Also, previous less precise parallax measurements of LP 658-2 present in YPC (Yale Parallax Catalog) and among results of CTIOPI 1.5 m telescope program:

LP 658-2 parallax measurements

Source	Paper	Parallax, mas	Distance, pc	Distance, ly	Ref.
YPC	van Altena et al., 1995	155.0 ± 2.1	6.45 ± 0.09	21.04 ± 0.29	
CTIOPI 1.5 m	TSN-14 (Costa et al., 2005)	156.93 ± 2.67	6.37 ± 0.11	20.78 ± 0.35	
CTIOPI 0.9 m	TSN-21 (Subasavage et al., 2009)	156.13 ± 0.84	6.40 ± 0.03	20.89 ± 0.11	

== Physical parameters ==
There are two sets of published physical parameters of LP 658–2, significantly differing from each other: one from Holberg et al. 2008 and Sion et al. 2009, the other from Subasavage et al. 2009.

=== Color ===
Despite it being classified as a "white" dwarf, it appears yellowish white rather than white due to its temperature being comparable to that of a K-type main sequence star.
