= G 240-72 =

Star in the constellation Draco

- Location of G 240-72 in the constellation Draco

Observation data Epoch J2000 Equinox J2000
- Constellation: Draco
- Right ascension: 17^{h} 48^{m} 07.99282^{s}
- Declination: +70° 52′ 35.9221″
- Apparent magnitude (V): 14.15

Characteristics
- Evolutionary stage: white dwarf
- Spectral type: DQP9.0
- Apparent magnitude (B): 14.55
- Apparent magnitude (V): 14.15
- Apparent magnitude (R): 13.5
- Apparent magnitude (I): 13.1
- Apparent magnitude (J): 12.709 ± 0.021
- Apparent magnitude (H): 12.528 ± 0.023
- Apparent magnitude (K): 12.507 ± 0.023

Astrometry
Proper motion (μ)	RA: −1266.387 mas/yr Dec.: 1108.801 mas/yr
Parallax (π)	160.9952±0.0119 mas
Distance	20.259 ± 0.001 ly (6.2114 ± 0.0005 pc)
Absolute magnitude (M_{V})	15.23 (Note: From apparent magnitude and parallax.)

Details
Mass	0.81 ± 0.01 M_{☉}
Radius	0.00984 (Note: From surface gravity and mass.) R_{☉}
Luminosity	0.000085 L_{☉}
Surface gravity (log g)	8.36 ± 0.02 cgs
Temperature	5590 ± 90 K
Rotation	>100 years
Age	5.69 (Note: Cooling age, i. e. age as degenerate star (not counting duration of previous existence as main sequence star and as giant star)) Gyr

Other designations
- GJ 1221, EGGR 372, G 240-72, LHS 455, LP 44-113, NLTT 45565, WD 1748+708, 2MASS J17480817+7052353

Database references
SIMBAD	data

G 240-72 (or WD 1748+708, or LHS 455, or GJ 1221) is a nearby white dwarf (degenerate star) of spectral class DQP9.0, located 20.3 light-years away in the constellation Draco.

== Distance ==
G 240-72 is the seventh closest white dwarf (after Sirius B, Procyon B, van Maanen's star, Gliese 440, 40 Eridani B and Stein 2051 B). Its trigonometric parallax, as measured by the Gaia space telescope, is 160.9952±0.0119 mas, corresponding to a distance of 6.2114 parsecs (20.259 light-years).

== Properties ==
G 240-72 has a mass of 0.81 Solar masses and surface gravity 10^{8.36} (2.29×10^{8}) cm·s^{−2}, or approximately 234 000 of Earth's, corresponding to a radius 6850 km, or 107% of Earth's.

This white dwarf has a relatively low temperature of 5590 K (slightly cooler than the Sun), and an old cooling age, i.e. the age as a degenerate star (not counting the duration of its previous existence as a main sequence and giant star) of 5.69 Gyr. It has a white appearance, due to its similar temperature to the Sun. It has a pure helium atmosphere and rotates very slowly, with period of possibly over 100 years.
