= NGC 6181 =

Galaxy in the constellation Hercules

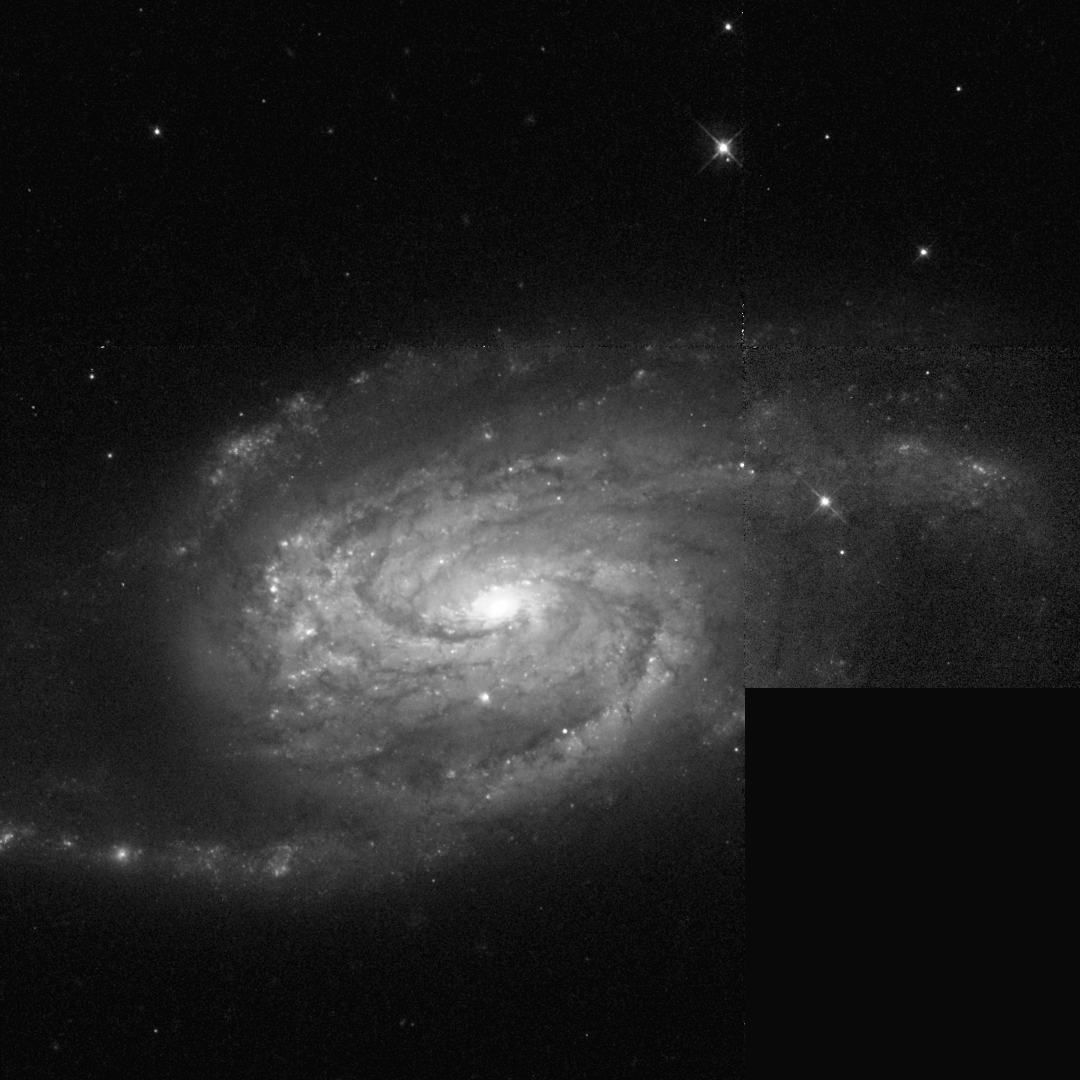
- NGC 6181 imaged by the Hubble Space Telescope

Observation data (J2000 epoch)
- Constellation: Hercules
- Right ascension: 16^{h} 32^{m} 20.9715^{s}
- Declination: +19° 49′ 34.972″
- Redshift: 0.007909
- Heliocentric radial velocity: 2371±1 km/s
- Galactocentric velocity: 2415±3 km/s
- Distance: 116.2 ± 8.1 Mly (35.63 ± 2.49 Mpc)
- Apparent magnitude (V): 10.42
- Absolute magnitude (V): -22.14

Characteristics
- Type: SAB(rs)c
- Size: ~78,000 ly (23.93 kpc) (estimated)
- Apparent size (V): 2.50′ × 1.1′

Other designations
- IRAS 16301+1955, UGC 10439, MCG +03-42-020, PGC 58470, CGCG 109-031
- References: NASA/IPAC extragalactic datatbase, http://spider.seds.org/, http://cseligman.com

NGC 6181 is a barred spiral galaxy located in the constellation Hercules. It is designated as SB(rs)c in the galaxy morphological classification scheme and was discovered by William Herschel on 28 April 1788. The galaxy is 107 million light years away.

== Supernovae ==
Three supernovae have been observed in NGC 6181:

- SN 1926B (type unknown, mag. 14.8) was discovered by Adriaan van Maanen on a photographic plate taken on 17 June 1926, but the discovery was not made until February 1941.
- SN 1951I (type unknown, mag. 15.7) was discovered in April 1951.
- SN 2019aai (Type II, mag. 17.84) was discovered by the Zwicky Transient Facility on 20 January 2019.

== See also ==
- List of NGC objects (6001–7000)

== Gallery ==
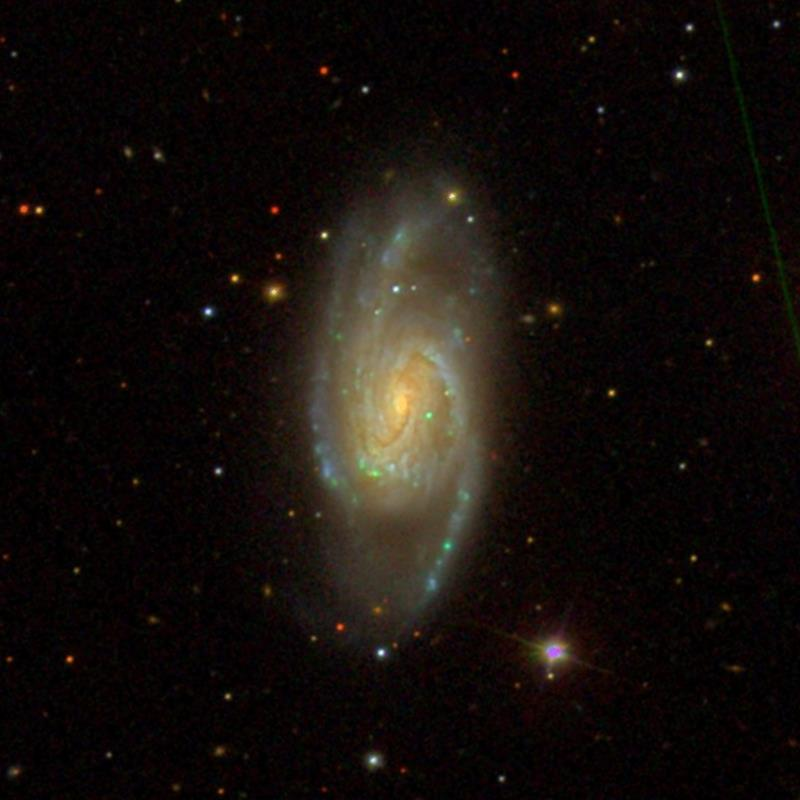
NGC 6181 by the Sloan Digital Sky Survey
