= GJ 1128 =

Star in the southern constellation of Carina

Observation data Epoch J2000 Equinox J2000
- Constellation: Carina
- Right ascension: 09^{h} 42^{m} 46.3430^{s}
- Declination: −68° 53′ 06.009″
- Apparent magnitude (V): 12.78

Characteristics
- Evolutionary stage: main sequence
- Spectral type: M4.0V

Astrometry
Proper motion (μ)	RA: −75.828 mas/yr Dec.: +1128.849 mas/yr
Parallax (π)	153.7593±0.0249 mas
Distance	21.212 ± 0.003 ly (6.504 ± 0.001 pc)
Absolute magnitude (M_{V})	13.715

Details
Mass	0.175 M_{☉}
Radius	0.190 R_{☉}
Luminosity	0.0043 L_{☉}
Surface gravity (log g)	5.03 cgs
Temperature	3,144 K
Metallicity [Fe/H]	0.09 dex
Rotation	157.4 days

Other designations
- GJ 1128, L 100-115, LFT 680, LHS 271, LTT 3572, NLTT 22480, GSC 09209-00444, 2MASS J09424635-6853060, DENIS J094246.3-685309

Database references
SIMBAD	data

GJ 1128 is a star in the constellation Carina. It is somewhat nearby, located about 21.212 light-years away from Earth.

GJ 1128 is a red dwarf star with a mere 0.43% of the solar luminosity, and an estimated mass 17.5% of the mass of the Sun. It has 19% of the solar radius and its effective temperature is around 3,100 K, values comparable to the Barnard's Star. It is a long-term variable with the prominent 5-year starspot cycle comparable to that of Sun's.

The discovery designation of GJ 1128 is L 100-115, from a 1944 catalogue of high-proper-motion stars. It was then included in the 1979 Gliese–Jahreiss catalogue of nearby stars with an estimated parallax of 125 mas. The small distance from Sun to the GJ 1128 was confirmed by later direct measurements of its parallax.

== See also ==
- List of star systems within 20–25 light-years
