= GJ 3522 =

Nearby star in the constellation Cancer

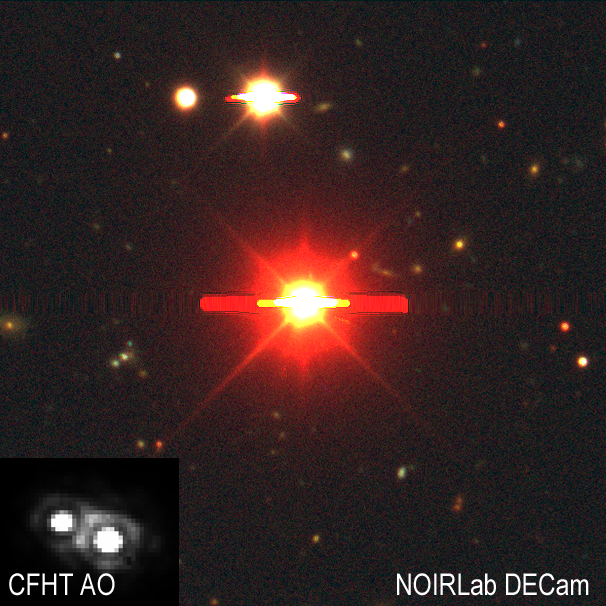
- DECam image and CFHT adaptive optics image (lower left) of the resolved outer companion

Observation data Epoch J2000 Equinox J2000
- Constellation: Cancer
- Right ascension: 08^{h} 58^{m} 56.3208^{s}
- Declination: +08° 28′ 26.068″
- Apparent magnitude (V): 10.98

Characteristics
- Evolutionary stage: red dwarf
- Spectral type: M3.5V

Astrometry
| Parallax (π) | 147.66±1.98 mas |
| Distance | 22.1 ± 0.3 ly (6.77 ± 0.09 pc) |

Other designations
- DEL 2, IRAS 08562+0840, LHS 6158, LTT 12352, 2MASS J08585633+0828259, WDS J08589+0829AB, USNO-B1.0 0984-00186842

Database references
| SIMBAD | data |

GJ 3522 (G 41–14) is a nearby triple star system, consisting of a short-period double-line spectroscopic binary and an outer companion that was discovered with adaptive optics on the CFHT. The system is 22 light-years (6.8 parsec) from Earth.

The inner binary orbit each other every 7.6 days. Orbiting around the inner binary the outer companion completes an orbit every 5.7 years. The system has a spectral type of M3.5.

The star shows flares in the optical and x-ray. It also shows activity in H-alpha and ultraviolet.

== See also ==
- List of star systems within 20–25 light-years
