= H1504+65 =

White dwarf in Ursae Minoris constellation

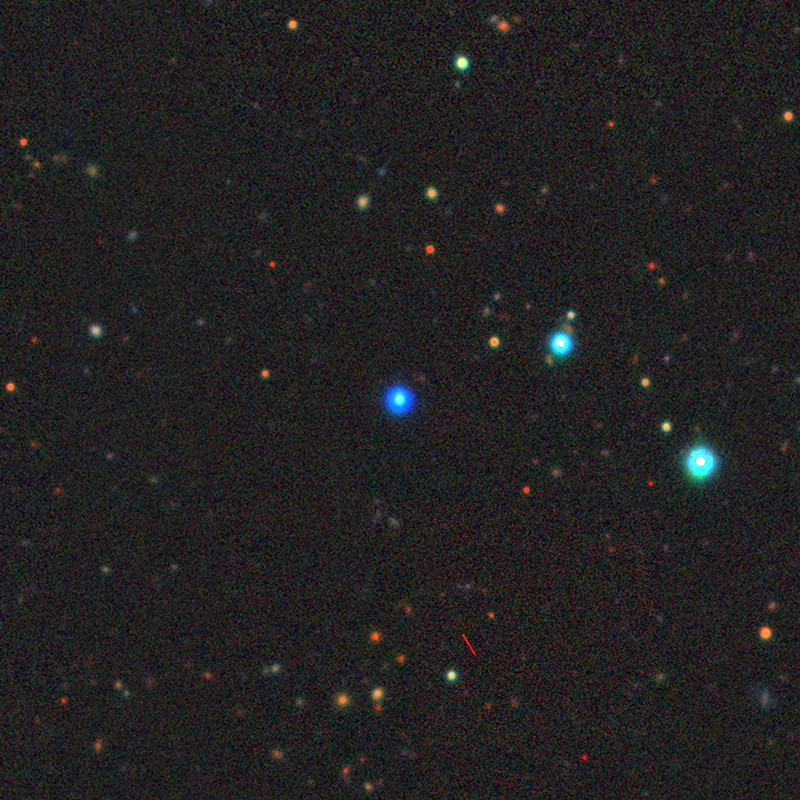
- This image Captured by Legacy Survey DR10

Observation data Epoch J2000 Equinox J2000
- Constellation: Ursa Minor
- Right ascension: 15^{h} 02^{m} 09.6297^{s}
- Declination: +66° 12′ 19.146″
- Apparent magnitude (V): 16.37

Characteristics
- Evolutionary stage: white dwarf
- Spectral type: DZQ1

Astrometry
Proper motion (μ)	RA: −6.055±0.128 mas/yr Dec.: 8.106±0.112 mas/yr
Parallax (π)	2.0573±0.0591 mas
Distance	1,590 ± 50 ly (490 ± 10 pc)

Details
Temperature	200,000 K

Other designations
- WD 1501+663

Database references
SIMBAD	data

H1504+65 is an enigmatic peculiar star in the constellation Ursa Minor. With a surface temperature of 200,000 K (360,000°F) and an atmosphere composed of carbon, oxygen and 2% neon, it is the second hottest white dwarf ever discovered, with only RX J0439.8−6809 being hotter. It is thought to be the stellar core of a post-asymptotic giant branch star, though its composition is unexplainable by current models of stellar evolution.
