= WISE J2030+0749 =

Star in the constellation Delphinus

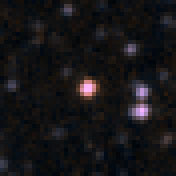
- WISE J2030+0749; Credit: unWISE

Observation data Epoch J2000 Equinox J2000
- Constellation: Delphinus
- Right ascension: 20^{h} 30^{m} 42.330^{s}
- Declination: +07° 49′ 35.78″

Characteristics
- Spectral type: T1.5
- Apparent magnitude (i (SDSS)): 21.810 ± 0.140
- Apparent magnitude (z (SDSS)): 17.195 ± 0.014
- Apparent magnitude (J (2MASS)): 14.227 ± 0.029
- Apparent magnitude (H (2MASS)): 13.435 ± 0.033
- Apparent magnitude (K_{s} (2MASS)): 13.319 ± 0.039
- Apparent magnitude (w1 (WISE)): 12.956 ± 0.025
- Apparent magnitude (w2 (WISE)): 12.122 ± 0.025
- Apparent magnitude (w3 (WISE)): 10.964 ± 0.110

Astrometry
Proper motion (μ)	RA: 664.047 mas/yr Dec.: -111.659 mas/yr
Parallax (π)	102.7966±0.8009 mas
Distance	31.7 ± 0.2 ly (9.73 ± 0.08 pc)

Other designations
- WISE J203042.79+074934.7; WISE J2030+0749

Database references
SIMBAD	data

WISE J2030+0749 is a nearby brown dwarf of spectral type T1.5, in the constellation Delphinus, approximately 31.7 light-years (9.7 parsecs) from Earth.

== History of observations ==
The discovery of WISE J2030+0749 was announced in 2013 by Mace et al. and independently by Bihain et al.

Mace et al. selected T-type brown dwarf candidates from the WISE All-Sky source catalogue and carried out follow up observations using a variety of telescopes. On September 11, 2011, WISE J2030+0749 was observed using SpeX at the Infrared Telescope Facility (IRTF). The discovery paper was submitted to The Astrophysical Journal Supplement, accepted for publication on 2013 January 15 and published in March, 2013. The total number of brown dwarfs announced in Mace et al. (2013) is 87, all are of T-type.

Bihain et al. selected sources with colours typical for T dwarfs from the WISE All-Sky source catalogue and checked them for high proper motion using older surveys: 2MASS, DENIS, SDSS, SSS, DSS and UKIDSS. Three objects among about ten candidates, including WISE J2030+0749, were selected for spectroscopic follow up with the Large Binocular Telescope (LBT). On November 8, 2012, Bihain et al. carried out follow up observations of WISE J2030+0749 with near-Infrared spectrograph LUCI 1 on LBT. On June 25, 2013 Astronomy & Astrophysics received the discovery paper, which was accepted for publication 10 July 2013.

== Distance ==
The distance of WISE J2030+0749 was estimated by Bihain et al. using mean absolute magnitudes of single T1/T2 dwarfs, derived by Dupuy & Liu (2012) from trigonometric parallaxes: 10.5 ± 2.6 pc (34.2 ± 8.5 ly).

Its parallax was later measured by the Gaia space telescope, with the Gaia DR3 parallax corresponding to a distance of 9.73±0.08 pc (31.7±0.2 ly).

== See also ==
Two other T dwarfs, announced in Bihain et al (2013):

- WISE J0457−0207 (T2)
- WISE J0521+1025 (T7.5)
