= WISE 0825+2805 =

Brown dwarf in the constellation Cancer

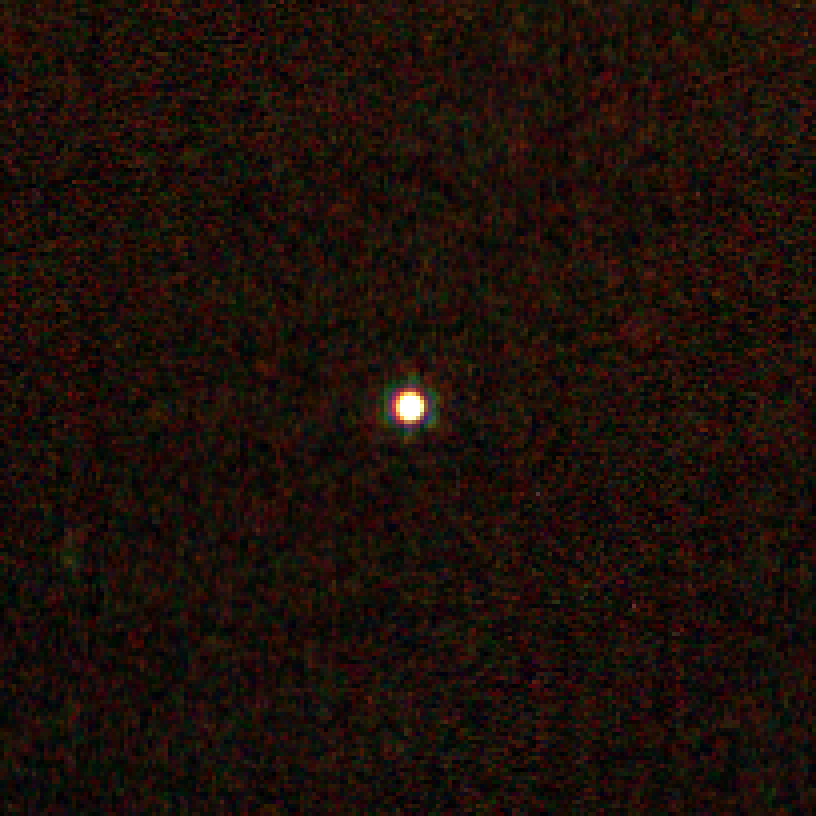
- WISE 0825+2805; Credit: JWST/MIRI; Faherty et al.

Observation data Epoch 2000 Equinox 2000
- Constellation: Cancer
- Right ascension: 08^{h} 25^{m} 07.35720^{s}
- Declination: +28° 05′ 48.5592″

Characteristics
- Spectral type: Y0.5
- Apparent magnitude (J): 22.53±0.10
- Apparent magnitude (H): 23.09±0.18

Astrometry
Radial velocity (R_{v})	−18.7±3.4 km/s
Proper motion (μ)	RA: −66.7±0.9 mas/yr Dec.: −235.8±0.9 mas/yr
Parallax (π)	152.6±2.0 mas
Distance	21.4 ± 0.3 ly (6.55 ± 0.09 pc)

Details
Mass	3.7±0.2 or 11±2 M_{Jup}
Radius	1.11±0.02 or 1.144±0.002 R_{Jup}
Surface gravity (log g)	3.85±0.02 or 4.33+0.07 −0.09 cgs
Temperature	359±3 K
Metallicity	$\begin{smallmatrix}\left[\ce{M}/\ce{H}\right]\end{smallmatrix}$ = 0.64±0.05
Age	414±23 Myr or 2 Gyr

Other designations
- WISEA J082507.37+280548.2, WISE J082507.35+280548.5

Database references
SIMBAD	data

WISE 0825+2805 (WISE J082507.35+280548.5) is a free-floating planetary-mass object or a brown dwarf. It is a Y dwarf with a spectral type of Y0.5. It is about 21.4 light-years away from Earth in the constellation Cancer. It is a potential member (93% chance) of the Corona of Ursa Major (CUMA) moving group, a collection of young stars that are 414±23 million years old.

== Discovery ==
WISE 0825+2805 was discovered in 2015 by Schneider et al. with the Wide-field Infrared Survey Explorer and the Hubble Space Telescope, using WFC3 near-infrared grism spectroscopy. The team also announced the discovery of three T-dwarfs as well as two additional Y-dwarfs (WISE J1206+8401 and WISE J2354+0240) in the same paper.

== Physical properties ==
WISE 0825+2805 has been observed with the James Webb Space Telescope's NIRCam and MIRI instruments. A best-fit model of WISE 0825+2805's spectral energy distribution (SED) indicates that its atmosphere is phosphine-free and diabatic. A good-fitting SED model requires an effective temperature of 350 Kelvin and a surface gravity of log g = 4.0. Alternatively, a lower surface gravity could improve the SED fit. The model parameters correspond to a mass of 5 M_{J} and an age of 800 Myr. On the other hand, if WISE 0825+2805 has the same age as the Corona of Ursa Major moving group (414±23 Myr), then the best-fit SED indicates a mass of 3.7±0.2 M_{J}, a radius of 1.144±0.002 R_{J}, a surface gravity of 10^{3.85±0.02 cgs} and an effective temperature of 359 ± 3 K (86 ± 3 °C; 187 ± 5 °F). However, a 2026 study found little evidence that WISE 0825+2805 is part of any moving group, and atmospheric retrievals indicate a mass of 11+2
−3 M_{J}, a radius of 1.11±0.02 R_{J}, a surface gravity of 10^{4.33+0.07
−0.09 cgs} and an effective temperature of 363 ± 3 K (90 ± 3 °C; 194 ± 5 °F). The position of WISE 0825+2805 in the surface gravity-temperature diagram then indicates an age of 2 Gyr.

== See also ==
- List of Y-dwarfs
- List of star systems within 20–25 light-years
