= ZTF J1901+1458 =

White dwarf star

Observation data Epoch J2000 Equinox ICRS
- Constellation: Aquila
- Right ascension: 19^{h} 01^{m} 32.73986^{s}
- Declination: +14° 58′ 07.1761″
- Apparent magnitude (V): +15.72

Characteristics
- Evolutionary stage: White dwarf

Astrometry
Proper motion (μ)	RA: +95.366 mas/yr Dec.: +72.558 mas/yr
Parallax (π)	24.1538±0.0489 mas
Distance	135.0 ± 0.3 ly (41.40 ± 0.08 pc)

Details
Mass	1.32±0.01 (C-O core) M_{☉} 1.29±0.01 (O-Ne core) M_{☉}
Radius	2,664+113 −109 km
Temperature	27,445+680 −1,390 K
Rotation	6.9373843±0.0000001 minutes
Age	0.50±0.01 (C-O core) Gyr; 0.48±0.01 (O-Ne core) Myr

Other designations
- WD 1859+148, 2MASS J19013271+1458068

Database references
SIMBAD	data

ZTF J1901+1458 (formally ZTF J190132.9+145808.7) is a white dwarf, about 135 light years (41.3 parsecs) away roughly in the direction of Epsilon Aquilae, discovered by the Zwicky Transient Facility circa 2021. It has around 1.3 times the mass of the Sun, nearly the largest expected mass for white dwarfs, which is defined by the Chandrasekhar limit. Its radius is about 2,664 km (1,655 mi), roughly the same as Ganymede, and it rotates once every 6.9373843 minutes. Its effective temperature is about 27,400 K (48,900 °F).

The object's extreme rate of spin is hard to explain without supposing ZTF J1901+1458 to be the result of a white dwarf merger, near the upper mass limit of a stable end product. Larger white dwarf mergers could be another mechanism of supernova production, which is not necessarily taken into account in how astronomers have traditionally inferred dark energy from supernova observations.

== See also ==
- List of white dwarfs
