= Gliese 408 =

Star in the constellation Leo

Observation data Epoch J2000 Equinox J2000
- Constellation: Leo
- Right ascension: 11^{h} 00^{m} 04.25701^{s}
- Declination: +22° 49′ 58.6450″
- Apparent magnitude (V): 10.020

Characteristics
- Spectral type: M2.5V
- U−B color index: +1.22
- B−V color index: +1.55
- V−R color index: +1.08
- R−I color index: +1.31

Astrometry
Radial velocity (R_{v})	2.65±0.14 km/s
Proper motion (μ)	RA: −426.958 mas/yr Dec.: −282.298 mas/yr
Parallax (π)	148.1986±0.0253 mas
Distance	22.008 ± 0.004 ly (6.748 ± 0.001 pc)
Absolute magnitude (M_{V})	10.82

Details
Mass	0.406±0.007 M_{☉}
Radius	0.390±0.007 R_{☉}
Luminosity (visual, L_{V})	0.0037 L_{☉}
Surface gravity (log g)	4.79±0.05 cgs
Temperature	3483(35) K
Metallicity [Fe/H]	−0.01(4) dex
Rotation	171.0±8.4 d
Rotational velocity (v sin i)	<2.3 km/s

Other designations
- GJ 408, HIP 53767, LHS 6193, LTT 12942, NLTT 25946, Ross 104, TYC 1978-1286-1

Database references
SIMBAD	data
ARICNS	data

Gliese 408 is a star located 22.0 light-years (6.7 parsecs) from the Solar System, located in the constellation of Leo. The stars nearest to Gliese 408 are Gliese 402, at 6.26 light years, and AD Leonis, at 6.54 light years.

Gliese 408 is a red dwarf with a spectral type of M2.5V. Much dimmer than the Sun, it has a luminosity of only 0.37% compared to the Sun, but still it is much more luminous than other red dwarf stars, like Proxima Centauri. Its effective temperature is about 3400 to 3500 K; its mass is about 41% compared to the Sun, and its radius is about 43% that of the Sun. Its rotational velocity is at most 2.3 km/s. No evidence of a circumstellar disk has been found around Gliese 408.
