= Gliese 402 =

Star in the constellation Leo

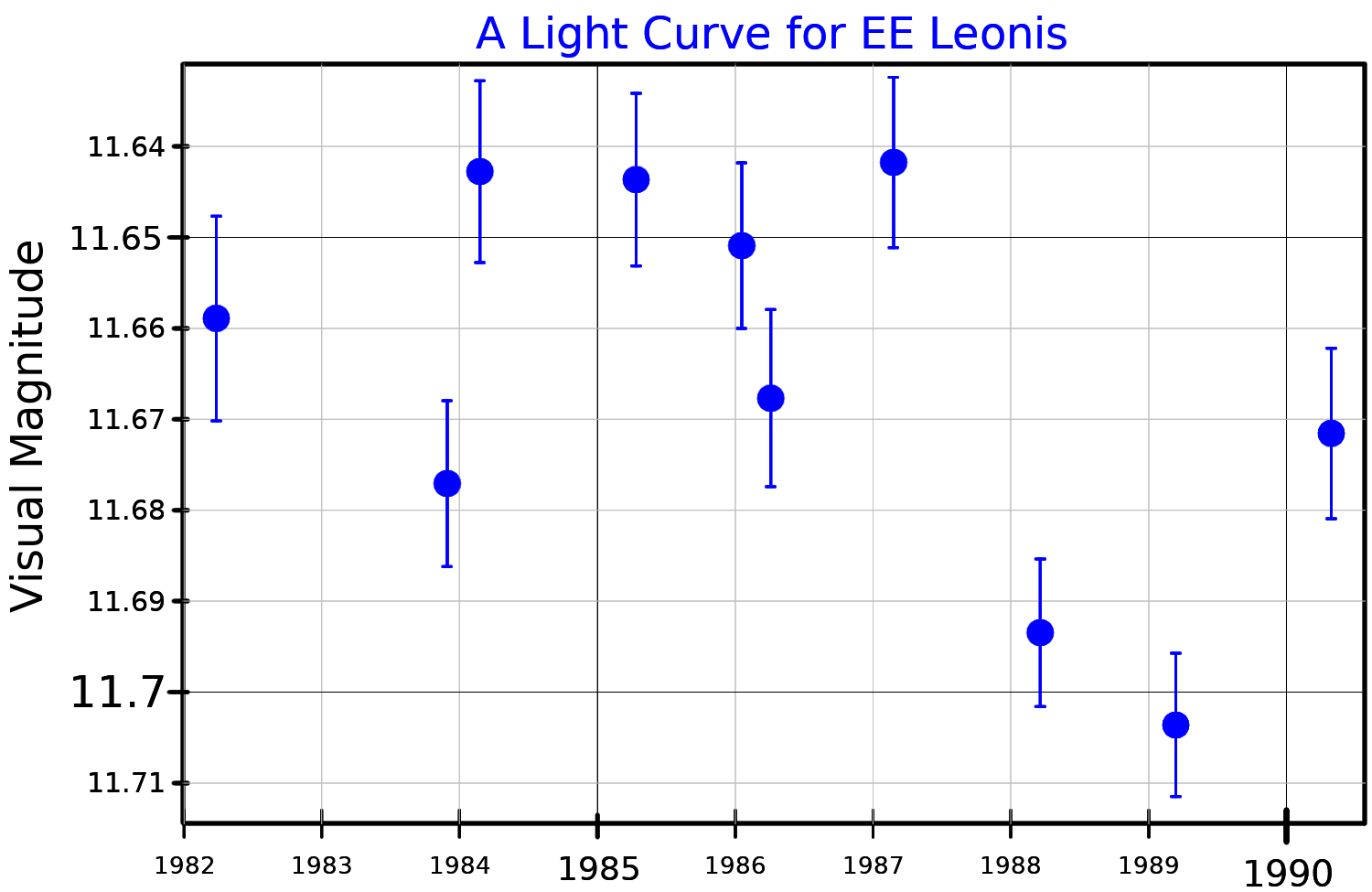
- A visual-band light curve for EE Leonis, adapted from Weis (1994)

Observation data Epoch J2000 Equinox ICRS
- Constellation: Leo
- Right ascension: 10^{h} 50^{m} 52.03124^{s}
- Declination: +06° 48′ 29.2596″
- Apparent magnitude (V): 11.64 - 11.70

Characteristics
- Spectral type: M4.0V
- U−B color index: +1.16
- B−V color index: +1.66
- V−R color index: +1.24
- R−I color index: +1.57
- Variable type: BY Dra

Astrometry
Radial velocity (R_{v})	−1.24±0.23 km/s
Proper motion (μ)	RA: −856.289 mas/yr Dec.: −818.583 mas/yr
Parallax (π)	143.5391±0.0286 mas
Distance	22.722 ± 0.005 ly (6.967 ± 0.001 pc)
Absolute magnitude (M_{V})	12.47

Details
Mass	0.268+0.007 −0.006 M_{☉}
Radius	0.284±0.011 R_{☉}
Luminosity	0.00728±0.00025 L_{☉}
Surface gravity (log g)	4.5 cgs
Temperature	3,240+65 −60 K
Metallicity [Fe/H]	−0.06 dex

Other designations
- EE Leo, GJ 402, HIP 53020, G 45-8, G 44-40, LFT 742, LHS 294, LTT 12891, PLX 2524, Wolf 358

Database references
SIMBAD	data
ARICNS	data

Gliese 402 is a star located 22.722 light-years (6.967 parsecs) from the Solar System. Located in the constellation of Leo, it is also known as Wolf 358 from its entry in Max Wolf's star catalogue.

Gliese 402 is a BY Draconis variable, with its apparent magnitude varying between 11.64 and 11.70. The brightness changes are due to starspots and chromospheric activity combined with the rotation of the star. It has been given the variable star designation EE Leonis.

Like the vast majority of stars in the Solar neighborhood, Gliese 402 is a dim red dwarf. With an apparent magnitude +11.66, it is far too dim to be seen with the naked eye; it can only be seen with a telescope. Its luminosity is only 0.73% that of the Sun. Its spectral type is M4V and its effective temperature is 3,240 K. Its physical characteristics are quite similar to those of Ross 128 or Krüger 60 B, with a radius of about 26.8% of the Sun. Its projected rotation speed is at most 2.3 km/s or less, while its metallicity is slightly lower than that of the Sun.

The stars nearest to Gliese 402 are Gliese 393, at 3.43 light-years, Gliese 408, at 6.26 light-years, and Gliese 382 at 6.66 light-years.

== See also ==
- Wolf 359 – next entry on Max Wolf's catalogue
