= Stein 2051 =

Star in the constellation Camelopardalis

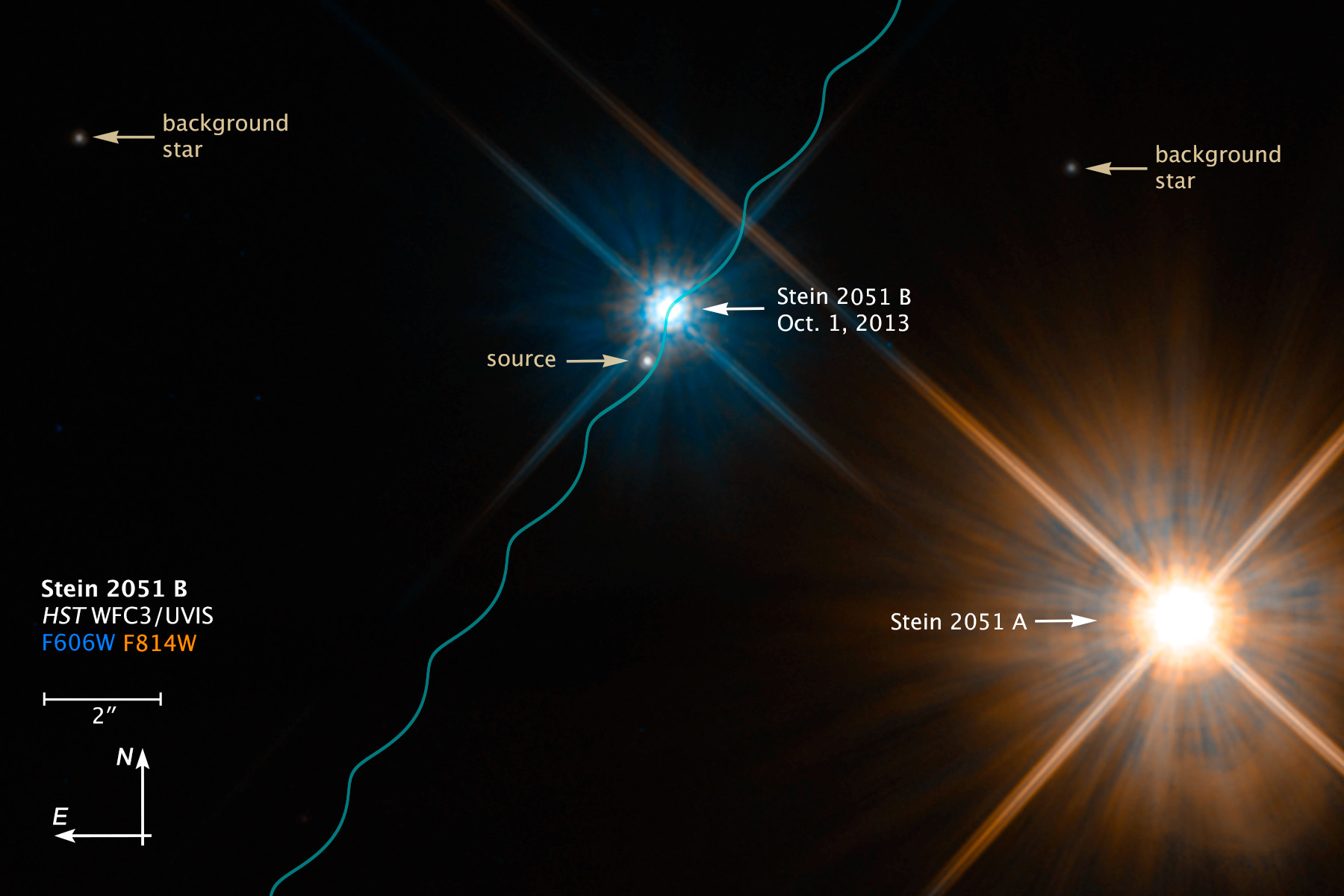
- Annotated Hubble Space Telescope image of the Stein 2051 components and a background star ("source") used to measure the bending of starlight Credit: NASA, ESA, and K. Sahu (STScI)

Observation data Epoch J2000 Equinox ICRS
- Constellation: Camelopardalis
- Stein 2051 A
- Right ascension: 04^{h} 31^{m} 11.5144^{s}
- Declination: +58° 58′ 37.464″
- Apparent magnitude (V): 10.98
- Stein 2051 B
- Right ascension: 04^{h} 31^{m} 12.5714^{s}
- Declination: +58° 58′ 41.293″
- Apparent magnitude (V): 12.43

Characteristics

Stein 2051 A
- Evolutionary stage: main sequence
- Spectral type: M4.0Ve
- U−B color index: +1.21
- B−V color index: +1.65

Stein 2051 B
- Evolutionary stage: white dwarf
- Spectral type: DC5
- U−B color index: -0.53
- B−V color index: +0.31

Astrometry

Stein 2051 A
Radial velocity (R_{v})	+29 km/s
Proper motion (μ)	RA: +1,300.365 mas/yr Dec.: −2,046.106 mas/yr
Parallax (π)	181.2438±0.0499 mas
Distance	17.995 ± 0.005 ly (5.517 ± 0.002 pc)
Absolute magnitude (M_{V})	+12.36

Stein 2051 B
Radial velocity (R_{v})	+2.0 km/s
Proper motion (μ)	RA: +1,334.780±0.021 mas/yr Dec.: −1,947.638±0.019 mas/yr
Parallax (π)	181.2730±0.0203 mas
Distance	17.993 ± 0.002 ly (5.5165 ± 0.0006 pc)
Absolute magnitude (M_{V})	+13.71

Details

Stein 2051 A
Mass	0.252±0.013 M_{☉}
Radius	0.292±0.031 R_{☉}
Luminosity	0.0081 L_{☉}
Surface gravity (log g)	4.80^{+0.13}_{−0.10} cgs
Temperature	3277^{+42}_{−75} K
Metallicity [Fe/H]	0.26^{+0.06}_{−0.22} dex
Rotational velocity (v sin i)	5.2^{+1.7}_{−2.7} km/s
Age	1.9 - 3.6 Gyr

Stein 2051 B
Mass	0.675±0.051 M_{☉}
Radius	0.0114±0.0004 R_{☉}
Luminosity	0.00003 (Note: Derived from the temperature and radius) L_{☉}
Surface gravity (log g)	8.153 (Note: Derived from the mass and radius) cgs
Temperature	7122±181 K
Age	1.9±0.4 (cooling age) Gyr

Other designations
- Stein 2051, G 175-34, HIP 21088, WDS J04312+5858AB, GJ 169.1, PLX 986.01
- Stein 2051 A: LHS 26, NLTT 13373, TYC 3744-412-1, 2MASS J04311147+585837, WISE J043113.20+585816.7
- Stein 2051 B: EGGR 180, LHS 27, NLTT 13375, TYC 3744-2062-1, 2MASS J04311201+5858476, WD 0426+58, WD2 0426+585, WD3 0426+588

Database references
SIMBAD	A
- B
- Location of Stein 2051 in the constellation Camelopardalis

Stein 2051 (Gliese 169.1, G 175-034, LHS 26/27) is a nearby binary star system, containing a red dwarf (component A) and a degenerate star (white dwarf) (component B), located in constellation Camelopardalis at about 18 ly (5.5 parsac) from Earth.

Stein 2051 is the nearest (red dwarf + white dwarf) separate binary system (40 Eridani BC is located closer at 16.26 light-years, but it is a part of a triple star system).

Stein 2051 B is the 6th nearest white dwarf after Sirius B, Procyon B, van Maanen's star, LP 145-141 and 40 Eridani B.

== Properties ==
The brighter of these two stars is A (a red dwarf), but the more massive is component B (a white dwarf).

In 2017, Stein 2051 B was observed passing in front of a more distant star. The bending of starlight by the gravitational field of the nearer star allowed its mass to be directly measured. The estimated mass of Stein 2051 B is 0.675±0.051 M_{☉}, which fits the expected range of a white dwarf with a carbon-oxygen core.
