= RX J0439.8−6809 =

Extremely hot white dwarf

RX J0439.8-6809
Observation data Epoch J2000 Equinox J2000
- Constellation: Dorado
- Right ascension: 04^{h} 39^{m} 49.64^{s}
- Declination: −68° 09′ 1.4″

Characteristics
- Evolutionary stage: White dwarf

Astrometry
Distance	30,000 ly (9,200 pc)

Details
Mass	0.73-1.02 M_{☉}
Radius	0.0015 R_{☉}
Temperature	250,000 K
Age	4.2 Myr

Other designations
- RX J0439.8-6809, 1RXS J043950.4-680854, 1ES 0439-68.2

Database references
SIMBAD	data

RX J0439.8-6809 is a white dwarf located 9.2 kiloparsecs from Earth in the galactic halo of the Milky Way galaxy. It is currently the hottest known white dwarf with a temperature of 250,000 Kelvin. This record surpassed H1504+65, the previous hottest known white dwarf which has a temperature of 200,000 Kelvin. It is not actively nuclear burning and is on the hot end of the white dwarf cooling track (WD cooling track), however it is cooling rather slowly, getting cooler every year by 35 Kelvin and taking 66 years for it to see a 1% change in the flux of UV/Optical. Its mass is not well defined but ranges between 0.73 and 1.02 solar masses and has a radius of 0.0015 Solar radii. The high mass of RX J0439.8-6809 could be due to a collision between two white dwarfs with a minimum mass of 0.5 solar masses.

== Composition ==
The atmospheric composition of RX J0439.8-6909 is dominated by carbon and oxygen, similar to H 1504+65. This CO abundance is probably due to a late helium flash while the star was still main sequence. A collision between two CO rich white dwarfs could also explain the chemical abundance.

== Natural history ==
The progenitor star is believed to have been a relatively massive main-sequence star. Due to its location of 5.2 kiloparsecs below the main disk of the Milky Way galaxy, it was probably ejected from a binary partner when it underwent a supernova explosion. When the progenitor star evolved into a white dwarf around 4.2 million years ago, it could have undergone a late helium flash, creating an abundance of CO. Alternatively, the CO abundance may be from the merging of two CO rich white dwarf stars with a minimum mass of 0.5 solar masses.

== Observational history ==
RX J0439.8-6809 was first observed as a very bright and persistent spot on X-ray images indicating a source of tremendous heat. It was assumed that it was not part of the Milky Way galaxy and was instead a member of the Large Magellanic Cloud (LMC). However, after discovering a lack of interstellar medium spectral lines and the determination of its distance, it was found to be a part of the Milky Way.
