= Gliese 784 =

Star in the constellation Telescopium

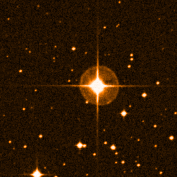
- The star

Observation data Epoch J2000.0 Equinox ICRS
- Constellation: Telescopium
- Right ascension: 20^{h} 13^{m} 53.396^{s}
- Declination: −45° 09′ 50.47″
- Apparent magnitude (V): 7.96

Characteristics
- Evolutionary stage: main sequence
- Spectral type: M0V
- B−V color index: 1.45

Astrometry
Radial velocity (R_{v})	−33.5±0.5 km/s
Proper motion (μ)	RA: +778.331 mas/yr Dec.: −159.939 mas/yr
Parallax (π)	162.2171±0.0225 mas
Distance	20.106 ± 0.003 ly (6.1646 ± 0.0009 pc)
Absolute magnitude (M_{V})	9.01

Details
Mass	0.58 M_{☉}
Radius	0.58 R_{☉}
Luminosity	0.06 L_{☉}
Temperature	3,754±92 K
Metallicity [Fe/H]	−0.07±0.06 dex
Rotation	48±12
Rotational velocity (v sin i)	1.0 km/s
Age	0.85±0.4 Gyr

Other designations
- CD−45 13677, HD 191849, HIP 99701, SAO 230110, PPM 325963, Ci 20 1196, LFT 1532, LHS 3531, LPM 730, LTT 7999, NLTT 48880, PLX 4794, PM 20103-4519, TYC 8392-2673-1, 2MASS J20135335-4509506

Database references
SIMBAD	data
- Location of Gliese 784 in the constellation Telescopium

Gliese 784 is a single red dwarf star located in the southern constellation of Telescopium that may host an exoplanetary companion. The star was catalogued in 1900, when it was included in the Cordoba Durchmusterung (CD) by John M. Thome with the designation CD−45 13677. It is too faint to be viewed with the naked eye, having an apparent visual magnitude of 7.96. Gliese 784 is located at a distance of 20.1 light-years from the Sun as determined from parallax measurements, and is drifting closer with a radial velocity of −33.5 km/s. The system is predicted to come as close as 11.4 light-years in ~121,700 years time.

This is a small M-type main-sequence star with a stellar classification of M0V. It is much younger than Sun at 0.85±0.4 billion years. Despite this, it appears to be rotating slowly with a period of roughly 48 days. The star has 58% of the mass and 58% of the radius of the Sun. It is radiating just 6% of the luminosity of the Sun from its photosphere at an effective temperature of 3,754 K.

== Planetary system ==
In June 2019 one planet candidate was reported in orbit around Gliese 784. An infrared excess was detected in 2020 that could suggest the presence of a circumstellar disk, but this is likely due to a background galaxy.

The Gliese 784 planetary system
Companion (in order from star)	Mass	Semimajor axis (AU)	Orbital period (days)	Eccentricity	Inclination (°)	Radius
b (unconfirmed)	9.4+4.6 −4.1 M_{🜨}	0.059 ± 0.006	6.6592+0.0033 −0.0038	0.05+0.23 −0.05	—	—
