= WISE J0521+1025 =

Brown dwarf in the constellation Orion

- Location of WISE J0521+1025 in the constellation Orion

Observation data Epoch 2012.773 Equinox J2000
- Constellation: Orion
- Right ascension: 05^{h} 21^{m} 26.349^{s}
- Declination: 10° 25′ 27.41″

Characteristics
- Spectral type: T7.5
- Apparent magnitude (J (2MASS)): 15.262
- Apparent magnitude (H (2MASS)): 15.222 ± 0.103
- Apparent magnitude (K_{s} (2MASS)): 14.665
- Apparent magnitude (w1 (WISE)): 14.098 ± 0.031
- Apparent magnitude (w2 (WISE)): 12.286 ± 0.026
- Apparent magnitude (w3 (WISE)): 10.306 ± 0.085

Astrometry
Proper motion (μ)	RA: +223.7±2.5 mas/yr Dec.: −438.3±2.5 mas/yr
Parallax (π)	150.2±3.0 mas
Distance	21.7 ± 0.4 ly (6.7 ± 0.1 pc)

Details
Temperature	727±88 K

Other designations
- WISE J052126.29+102528.4; WISE J0521+1025

Database references
SIMBAD	data

WISE J0521+1025 is a nearby brown dwarf of spectral type T7.5, located in the constellation Orion at approximately 21.7 light-years (6.7 parsecs) from Earth.

At the time of discovery, it was the nearest known T dwarf in the northern sky.

== History of observations ==
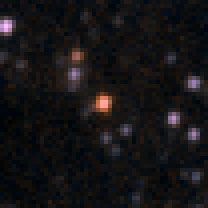
WISE J0521+1025 with unWISE

WISE J0521+1025 was discovered by Bihain et al. by selection of sources with colours typical for T dwarfs from WISE All-Sky source catalogue and checking them for high proper motion using older surveys: 2MASS, DENIS, SDSS, SSS, DSS and UKIDSS. Three objects among about ten candidates, including WISE J0521+1025, were selected for spectroscopic follow up with Large Binocular Telescope (LBT). October 9, 2012 Bihain et al. carried out follow up observations of WISE J0521+1025 with near-Infrared spectrograph LUCI 1 on LBT. June 25, 2013 Astronomy & Astrophysics received the discovery paper, which was accepted for publication 10 July 2013.

== Distance ==
Distance of WISE J0521+1025 was estimated by Bihain et al. using mean absolute magnitudes of single T7.5 dwarfs, derived by Dupuy & Liu (2012) from trigonometric parallaxes: 5.0 ± 1.3 pc (16.3 ± 4.2 ly).

== See also ==
- List of nearest stars and brown dwarfs

Two other T dwarfs, announced in Bihain et al (2013):

- WISE J0457−0207 (T2)
- WISE J2030+0749 (T1.5)
