= Adriaan van Maanen =

American astronomer (1884–1946)

- Born: March 31, 1884; Sneek, Netherlands
- Died: January 26, 1946 (aged 61); Pasadena, California, United States
- Education: University of Utrecht
- Known for: Van Maanen's star
- Scientific career
- Fields: Astronomy
- Workplaces: Mount Wilson Observatory; Yerkes Observatory; University of Groningen
- Doctoral advisor: Albertus Antonie Nijland

Adriaan van Maanen (March 31, 1884 – January 26, 1946) was a Dutch-American astronomer. Born in Friesland, he studied astronomy at the University of Utrecht, earning his Ph.D. in 1911, and worked briefly at the University of Groningen. In 1911, he came to the United States to work as a volunteer in an unpaid capacity at Yerkes Observatory. Within a year he got a position at the Mount Wilson Observatory, where he remained active until his death in 1946.

Van Maanen claimed that his astrometric measurements of spiral nebulae revealed detectable internal motions, supporting the idea that these nebulae were local, stellar and gaseous systems that existed in our galaxy. His measurements were not consistent with Edwin Hubble's discovery that the Andromeda Nebula and other spiral nebulae were extragalactic objects. The speed of rotation he calculated for the nebulae, if Hubble were correct as to their extragalactic nature, would have had their Cepheid stars moving at speeds faster than that of light. Van Maanen's astrometric measurements were subsequently found to be in error.

In 1924, van Maanen became member of the Royal Netherlands Academy of Arts and Sciences.

== Astrometric measurements ==
In the first and second decade of the 20th century there was a large controversy in the astronomical world about the size of the Milky Way, the size of the universe and the nature of spiral galaxies. The competing theories were the subject of the Great Debate between Harlow Shapley and Heber Doust Curtis in April 1920. Shapley believed that spiral galaxies were nearby objects within the Milky Way, and to support his position, he used Van Maanen's astrometric measurements; van Maanen had claimed to have detected the rotation of the spiral arms of spiral galaxies, finding that the rotational period would be about 100,000 years. Curtis believed that spiral galaxies were objects like the Milky Way and thus had to have a similar size, believed to be 5 kiloparsecs (kpc) at that time. A rotational period of 100,000 years would require that the spiral arms were rotating faster than the speed of light. Curtis agreed that if van Maanen's results were correct, the spiral nebulae could not be distant galaxies. However, Curtis rejected the results, believing them to be in error.

Later astronomers re-examined van Maanen's measurements, and concluded that he had made a serious error. He used a stereo blink comparator to compare new plates with plates some 10–20 years old. By blinking between those two plates he could detect small discrepancies on the positions of the objects. His reference objects were the field stars fairly near the edge of the plates. However, he did not take into account optical distortions which affected the apparent positions of these stars. This caused systematic errors resulting in imaginary movements.

A possible contributing factor is that van Maanen may have been experiencing confirmation bias. As it was widely believed that the "spiral nebulae" were relatively nearby and therefore ought to have a detectable rotation, a result which appeared to support that would not have been subject to as much scrutiny as one which contradicted it.
