= HD 4628 =

Star in the constellation Pisces

- Location of HD 4628 (circled in red)

Observation data Epoch J2000 Equinox ICRS
- Constellation: Pisces
- Right ascension: 00^{h} 48^{m} 22.97596^{s}
- Declination: +05° 16′ 50.2095″
- Apparent magnitude (V): 5.74

Characteristics
- Evolutionary stage: main sequence
- Spectral type: K2.5 V
- U−B color index: +0.60
- B−V color index: +0.89

Astrometry
Radial velocity (R_{v})	−10.37±0.12 km/s
Proper motion (μ)	RA: +755.894 mas/yr Dec.: −1141.019 mas/yr
Parallax (π)	134.4948±0.0578 mas
Distance	24.25 ± 0.01 ly (7.435 ± 0.003 pc)
Absolute magnitude (M_{V})	6.37

Details
Mass	0.778±0.007 M_{☉}
Radius	0.721±0.027 R_{☉}
Luminosity	0.29±0.03 L_{☉}
Surface gravity (log g)	4.54±0.06 cgs
Temperature	4,991±61 K
Metallicity [Fe/H]	−0.26±0.01 dex
Rotation	38.0 days
Age	5.4 Gyr

Other designations
- 96 G. Piscium, BD+04°123, GJ 33, HD 4628, HIP 3765, HR 222, SAO 109471, LHS 121, LTT 10285, Wolf 25, Lalande 1299

Database references
SIMBAD	data

HD 4628 (96 G. Piscium) is a main sequence star in the equatorial constellation of Pisces. It has a spectral classification of K2.5 V and an effective temperature of 5,055 K, giving it an orange-red hue with a slightly smaller mass and girth than the Sun. HD 4628 lies at a distance of approximately 24.3 light years from the Sun based on parallax. The apparent magnitude of 5.7 is just sufficient for this star to be viewed with the unaided eye. The star appears to be slightly older than the Sun—approximately 5.4 billion years in age. The surface activity is low and, based upon the detection of UV emission, it may have a relatively cool corona with a temperature of one million K.

The star has a relatively high proper motion of 1.4″ per year and is moving in our general direction with a radial velocity of −10.4 km/s. HD 4628 will make its closest approach to the Sun in about 32,000 years, when it comes within 20 ly (7.3 pc). No definitive companion has yet been found in orbit around this star. In 1958 it was thought to have stellar companion that was also a flare star, but this was subsequently disproved.

== See also ==
- List of nearest K-type stars
