= Gliese 440 =

Star in the constellation Musca

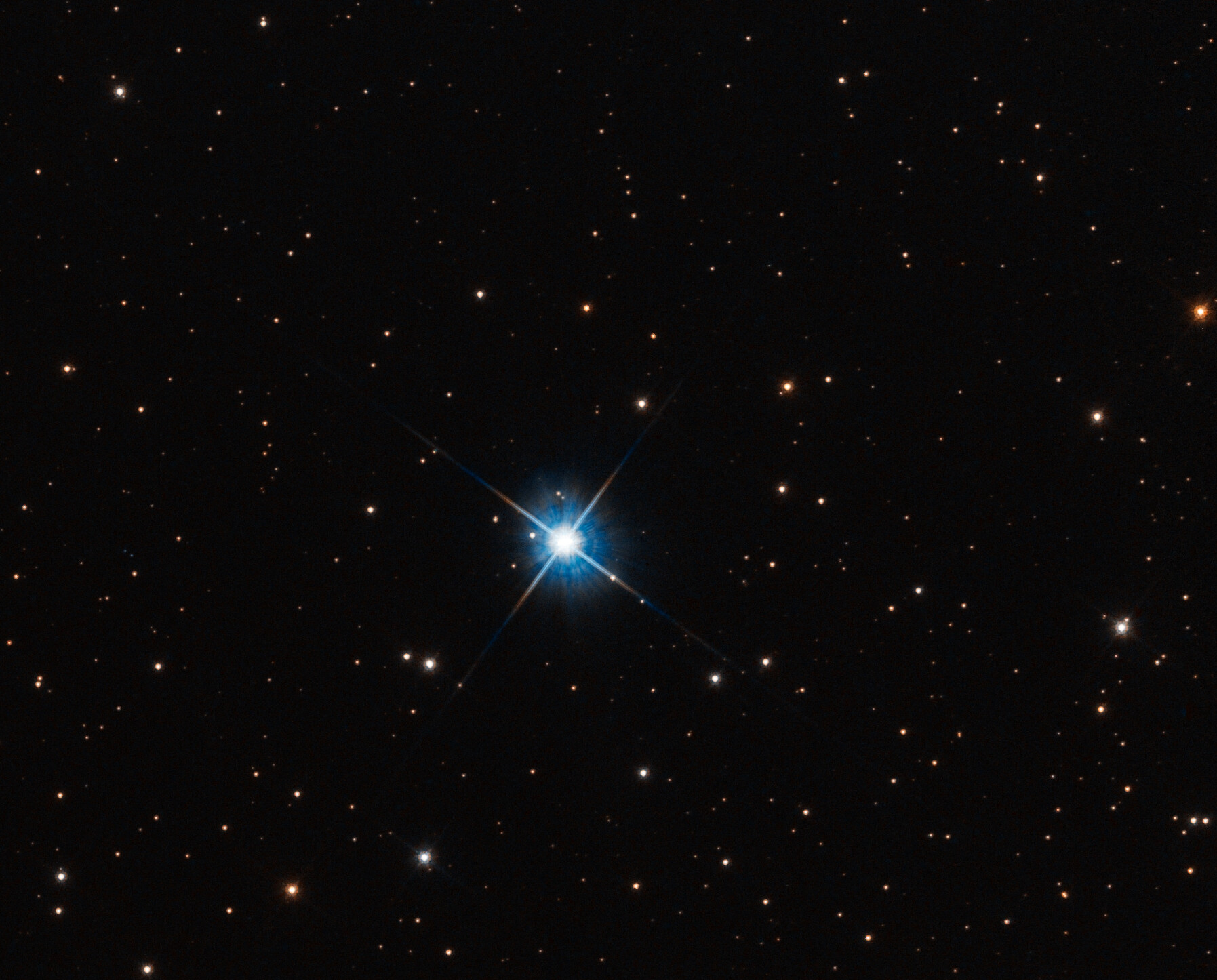
- Gliese 440 seen by the Hubble Space Telescope

Observation data Epoch J2000.0 Equinox ICRS
- Constellation: Musca
- Right ascension: 11^{h} 45^{m} 42.91694^{s}
- Declination: −64° 50′ 29.4620″
- Apparent magnitude (V): 11.50

Characteristics
- Evolutionary stage: white dwarf
- Spectral type: DQ6
- U−B color index: −0.59
- B−V color index: +0.19

Astrometry
Proper motion (μ)	RA: +2661.640 mas/yr Dec.: −344.933 mas/yr
Parallax (π)	215.6753±0.0181 mas
Distance	15.123 ± 0.001 ly (4.6366 ± 0.0004 pc)
Absolute magnitude (M_{V})	+13.17±0.03

Details
Mass	0.56±0.08 M_{☉}
Radius	0.0127±0.0003 R_{☉}
Luminosity	5.25+0.64 −0.57×10^{−4} L_{☉}
Surface gravity (log g)	7.983±0.016 cgs
Temperature	7,837+87 −82 K
Age	(as white dwarf) 1.21±0.09 Gyr

Other designations
- GJ 440, HIP 57367, BPM 7108, Ci 20 658, EGGR 82, L 145-141, LAWD 37, LHS 43, LP 145-141, LPM 396, LTT 4364, NLTT 28447, PLX 2716, PM 11429-6434, WD 1142-645, TYC 8981-4417-1, GSC 08981-04418, 2MASS J11454297-6450297

Database references
SIMBAD	data
- Location of Gliese 440 in the constellation Musca

Gliese 440, also known as L 145-141 or LAWD 37, is a white dwarf located 15.1 light-years (4.6 parsecs) from the Solar System in the constellation Musca, the nearest star in this constellation. It is the fourth closest white dwarf, after Sirius B, Procyon B, and van Maanen's star. Despite its closeness, Gliese 440 is intrinsically faint with just 0.05% the luminosity of the Sun, and can not be viewed to the naked eye with an apparent magnitude of +11.5.

== History of observations ==
Gliese 440 is known at least from 1917, when its proper motion was published by R. T. A. Innes and H. E. Wood in Volume 37 of Circular of the Union Observatory. The corresponding designation is UO 37. (Note: this designation is not unique for this star, that is all other stars, listed in the table in the Volume 37 of this Circular, also could be called by this name).

== Space motion ==
Gliese 440 may be a member of the Wolf 219 moving group, which has seven possible members. These stars share a similar motion through space, which may indicate a common origin. This group has an estimated space velocity of 160 km/s and is following a highly eccentric orbit through the Milky Way galaxy.

== Properties ==
White dwarfs are no longer generating energy at their cores through nuclear fusion, and instead are steadily radiating away their remaining heat. Gliese 440 has a DQ spectral classification, indicating that it is a rare type of white dwarf which displays evidence of atomic or molecular carbon in its spectrum.

Gliese 440 is small and faint, like typical white dwarfs, having just 0.0127 times the Sun's radius (1.4 times Earth's radius) and 0.05 percent the Sun's luminosity. Gliese 440 currently has an effective temperature of 7,800 K and will cool as its residual heat escape to the cosmos. The rate of cooling allows its age in the white dwarf stage to be estimated at 1.2 billion years.

In 2019, Gliese 440 was observed passing in front of a more distant star. The bending of starlight by the gravitational field of Gliese 440 was observed by the Hubble Space Telescope, allowing its mass to be directly measured at 0.56±0.08 M_{☉}. The mass fits the expected range of a white dwarf with a carbon-oxygen core. This was the second mass determination of a white dwarf using this method, after Stein 2051 B.

Gliese 440 is the remnant of a massive B-type star that had an estimated 4.4 solar masses. While it was on the main sequence, it probably was a spectral class B star (in the range B4–B9). Most of the star's original mass was shed after it passed into the asymptotic giant branch stage, just prior to becoming a white dwarf.

== Search for companions ==
A survey with the Hubble Space Telescope revealed no visible orbiting companions, at least down to the limit of detection.

Its proximity, mass and temperature have led to it being considered a good candidate to look for Jupiter-like planets. Its relatively large mass and high temperature mean that the system is relatively short-lived and hence of more recent origin.

Hipparcos-Gaia proper motion shows an anomaly that hints to the presence of an exoplanet that has a mass of either 0.44 or 0.60 M_{J} which is between Saturn and Jupiter.

== See also ==
- List of nearest stars
- List of exoplanets and planetary debris around white dwarfs
