= Sirius B =

Closest known white dwarf star to Earth

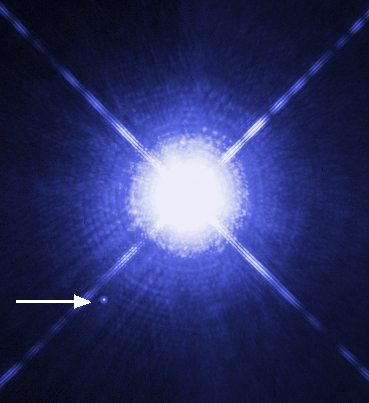
- Hubble Space Telescope image of Sirius System, the dim star on the lower left is Sirius B

Observation data Epoch J2000 Equinox ICRS
- Constellation: Canis Major
- Right ascension: 06^{h} 45^{m} 09.0^{s}
- Declination: −16° 43′ 06″
- Apparent magnitude (V): 8.44

Characteristics
- Evolutionary stage: White dwarf
- Spectral type: DA2
- U−B colour index: −1.04
- B−V colour index: −0.03

Astrometry
Radial velocity (R_{v})	−5.50 km/s
Proper motion (μ)	RA: −461.571 mas/yr Dec.: −914.520 mas/yr
Parallax (π)	378.9±1.4 mas
Distance	8.61 ± 0.03 ly (2.639 ± 0.010 pc)
Absolute magnitude (M_{V})	+11.18

Orbit
Primary	α Canis Majoris A
Secondary	α Canis Majoris B
Period (P)	50.1284±0.0043 yr
Semi-major axis (a)	7.4957±0.0025" (19.8 AU (Note: Semi-major axis in AU = (semimajor axis in seconds)/ parallax = 7.56″/0.37921 = 19.8 AU; as the eccentricity is 0.6, the distance fluctuates between 40% and 160% of that, roughly from 8 AU to 32 AU.))
Eccentricity (e)	0.59142±0.00037
Inclination (i)	136.336±0.040°
Longitude of the node (Ω)	45.400±0.071°
Periastron epoch (T)	1994.5715±0.0058
Argument of periastron (ω) (secondary)	149.161±0.075°

Details
Mass	1.018±0.011 M_{☉}
Radius	0.008098±0.6% R_{☉}
Radius	5,634±34 km
Luminosity	0.02448±1.3% L_{☉}
Surface gravity (log g)	8.591±0.016 cgs
Temperature	25,369±46 K
Age	228+10 −8 Myr

Other designations
- EGGR 49, WD 0642-166, GCTP 1577.00

Database references
SIMBAD	data

Sirius B is a white dwarf star and the faint companion to Sirius A, the brightest star in Earth's night sky (also known as the "Dog Star"), located in the constellation of Canis Major or the "Greater Dog".

It is a white dwarf, a remnant of an intermediate-mass star that has exhausted its fuel, and is the closest example to Earth. It is the secondary component of the Sirius binary system, of which the 'A' component is the brightest star in the night sky. Sirius B, on the other hand, cannot be seen to the naked eye as its luminosity is only 2% that of the Sun. Sirius is the fifth-nearest star system to the Sun, 8.6 light-years distant.

Like all white dwarfs, Sirius B is dense: while its size is comparable to that of Earth, its mass is equivalent to that of the Sun. It is the remains of a 5 M_{☉} star that existed until around 100 million years ago. Sirius B's current temperature is 25,000 K (24,700 °C; 44,500 °F), 2.5 times hotter than Sirius A and over four times hotter than the Sun. It no longer produces energy via nuclear fusion, and it will cool as its remaining heat escapes to space over time.

Due to its proximity, Sirius B has been the target of many studies in the last decades in attempt to discover extrasolar planets. None of them have detected a planet around Sirius B, though some planetary architecture still cannot be ruled out by current observations.

== Background ==
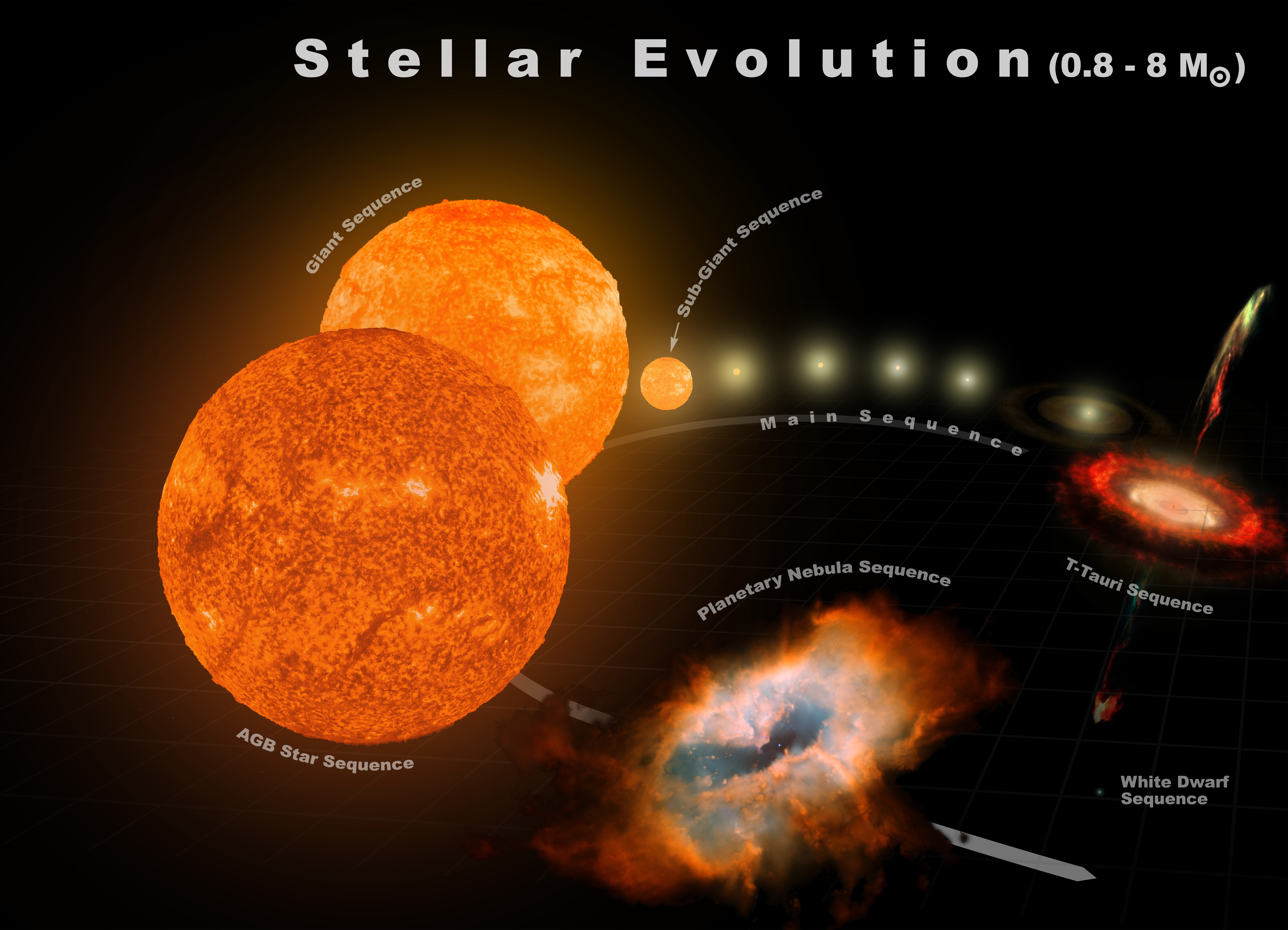
The evolution of intermediate-mass stars (0.8 to eight times the mass of the Sun)

White dwarfs are remnants of intermediate-mass stars (such as the Sun) which have exhausted their fuel. Stars produce energy by the nuclear fusion of four hydrogen nuclei into one helium nucleus. The energy released balanced that radiated by the star and keeps the star in hydrostatic equilibrium. Eventually, in intermediate-mass stars, the core runs out of hydrogen, the outer layers start to expand and the star becomes a red giant, dozens to hundreds of times its original size. The core shrinks in size once there is no energy production to maintain it against gravity. Then nuclear fusion of hydrogen starts in a shell surrounding the core and, when the temperature of the core is high enough, helium fusion into carbon is achieved. In its last evolutionary stages, the star ejects its outer layers and only a degenerate core is left.

White dwarfs do not produce energy via nuclear fusion and radiate their residual heat, cooling over time. When virtually all heat has escaped, they will become black dwarfs, which is expected to take over 10 trillion years, much more than the current age of the universe of 14 billion years. White dwarfs have an enormous density, from 100,000 to 100,000,000 grams per cubic centimeter, so that a teaspoon of white dwarf matter could weigh 5.5 tonnes. One of the smallest and most massive white dwarfs is ZTF J1901+1458, which is over 1.3 times more massive than the Sun, yet has a radius of a mere 2,140 km, between the Moon and Mercury. Other typical white dwarfs like Procyon B or van Maanen 2 have masses of 0.6 and 0.7 solar masses (M_{☉}) and radii of about 0.012 and 0.011 solar radii (R_{☉}), (Note: Applying the Stefan–Boltzmann law with a nominal solar effective temperature of 5,772 K: $$\sqrt{\biggl(\frac{5,772}{6,130}\biggr)^4 \cdot 10^{-3.79}} = 0.01129\ R_\odot$$.) respectively.

== Discovery and observations ==
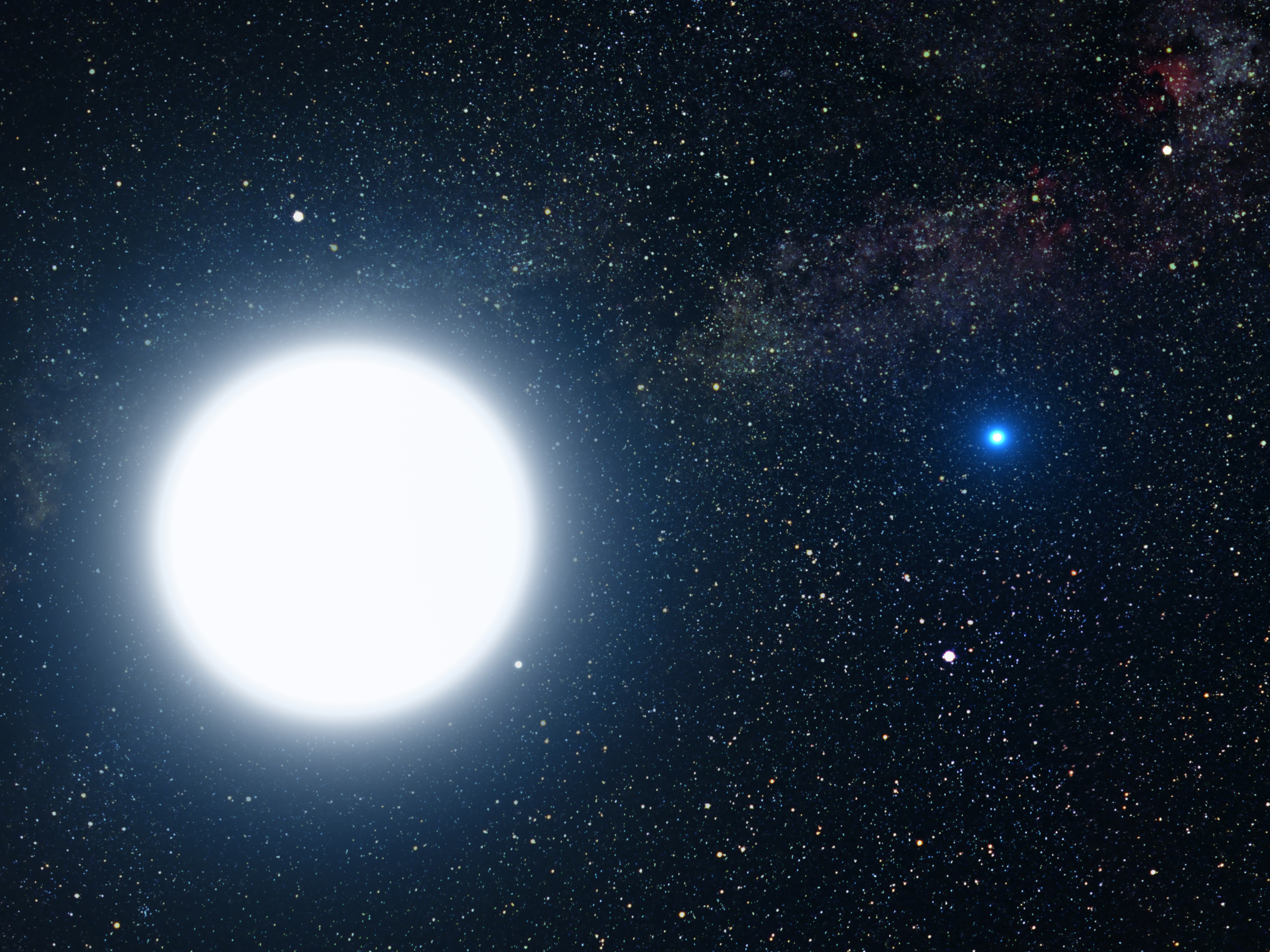
Artistic representation of Sirius star system

The discovery of Sirius B dates from the mid 19th century. In a letter dated 10 August 1844, the German astronomer Friedrich Wilhelm Bessel found that the apparent motion of Sirius A varies, something never observed before. This was the first hint that Sirius has an unseen companion. The faint companion, Sirius B, was first observed on 31 January 1862 by the American telescope-maker and astronomer Alvan Graham Clark. This happened during testing of an 18.5-inch (470 mm) aperture great refractor telescope for Dearborn Observatory, which was one of the largest refracting telescope lenses in existence at the time, and the largest telescope in the United States. Sirius B's sighting was confirmed on 8 March with smaller telescopes.

In 1915, Walter Sydney Adams, using a 60-inch (1.5 m) reflector at Mount Wilson Observatory, observed the spectrum of Sirius B and determined that it was a faint whitish star. This led astronomers to conclude that it was a white dwarf—the second to be discovered, after 40 Eridani B.

Due to the close presence of Sirius A, whose light outshine B, observations of Sirius B have been difficult in the 20th century. In particular, measuring physical properties such as radius and temperature was extremely hard due to these interferences, while the mass could be relatively easily measured from the binary's orbit. In ultraviolet wavelengths, however, Sirius B is brighter than Sirius A, and with the development of ultraviolet satellites in the second half of the century such as the Extreme Ultraviolet Explorer (EUVE) and the International Ultraviolet Explorer (IUE), precise measurements of such properties were achieved. In 1998, astronomers combining spectroscopic measurements of the EUVE and IUE satellites derived a temperature of 25,000±35 K, together with a surface gravity of 10^{8.51±0.04 cgs}, precisions much higher than those of previous observations. A year before, the Hipparcos mission measured directly the system's distance from parallax, resulting in value of 2.637 ± 0.011 parsecs (8.601 ± 0.036 light-years), a 20% improvement toward previous measurements. Together with the ultraviolet data, this resulted in a radius of 0.0084±0.00025 R_{☉}.

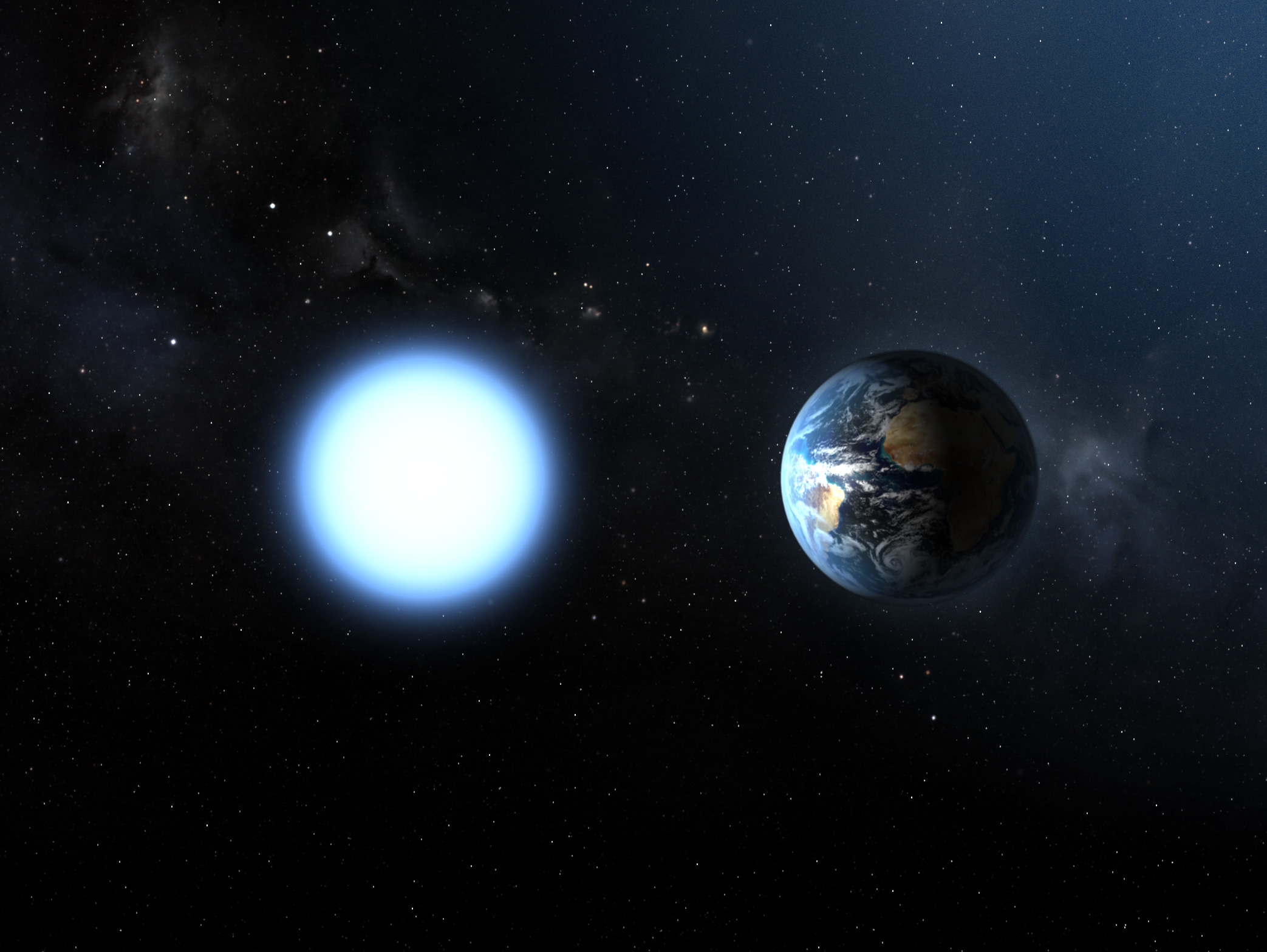
Artistic representation of the sizes of Sirius B and Earth

== Characteristics ==
The mass of Sirius B can be measured based on the relationship between mass, orbital period, and semi-major axis in Kepler's third law. The first measurement, in 1910, resulted in a value of 0.94 M_{☉}. This is not so far from modern measurements; one from 2017 which combines multiple observations yields a value of 1.018±0.011 M_{☉}. The mass of Sirius B makes it one of the most massive white dwarfs known, almost double the average of 0.6 M_{☉}.

The radius of Sirius B is 0.008098±1.6% times the Sun's radius, equivalent to 5,635 km (3,501 mi) or 0.88 times Earth's radius (6,378 km). This is significantly smaller than other white dwarfs, such as Procyon B or van Maanen 2. White dwarfs, due to their structure, have the unusual property that the more massive they are, the smaller they are, so a smaller white dwarf has more mass than a larger one. The mass and radius of Sirius B can also be measured from its gravitational redshift, which results in values of 1.017 M_{☉} and 0.00803 R_{☉}.

As white dwarfs do not produce heat and will cool over time, its age as a white dwarf can be estimated by calculating how long it took to cool to its current temperature, the so-called "cooling age". Sirius B has a mass of 1.02 M_{☉} and a temperature of 25,000 K or °C, compared to the 5,772 K (5,499 °C) of the Sun or 9,845 K (9,572 °C) of Sirius A. From this method, an age of 126 million years is obtained. This is about half of the total age of the system of 230 million years, the other half being the time for the star to burn its fuel and become a white dwarf.

From theoretical calculations, the mass of the progenitor of Sirius B is calculated at 5.0±0.1 times the mass of the Sun, and it is estimated to have been a B-type main-sequence star of class B5V. The higher mass means Sirius B used to be more luminous than Sirius A, so it burned the hydrogen at its core much faster. Higher mass in the system also means the orbit used to be smaller—the periastron is predicted to have been between 1.5 and 1.6 AU. During the red giant phase, Sirius B expanded to hundreds of times the size of the Sun, potentially transferring mass to Sirius A, albeit never engulfing its companion.

Sirius B is primarily composed of a carbon–oxygen mixture that was generated by helium fusion in the progenitor star. This is overlaid by an envelope of lighter elements, with the materials segregated by mass because of the high surface gravity. The outer atmosphere of Sirius B is now almost pure hydrogen—the element with the lowest mass—and no other elements are seen in its spectrum.

== Search for planets ==
Sirius B has been the subject of multiple surveys and searches for exoplanets orbiting it. Detection methods include radial velocity monitoring, direct imaging, and astrometric methods, but no exoplanet has been detected. High-contrast imaging with instruments such as VLT/SPHERE and Hubble Space Telescope has ruled out giant planets with masses greater than approximately 10–35 M_{J} at separations of a few AU. Gaia DR3 astrometry shows an acceleration which may or may not be fully explained by the companion star Sirius A; an undetected planet less than 1–2 M_{J} at a distance of 0.5–1.3 AU cannot be ruled out. Multiple exoplanets have been found around other white dwarfs, the first of which was PSR B1620−26 b.

The Sirius B planetary system
Companion (in order from star)	Mass	Semimajor axis (AU)	Orbital period (years)	Eccentricity	Inclination (°)	Radius
(hypothetical)	<1–2 M_{J}	0.5–1.3	—	—	—	—

== See also ==
- List of stars in Canis Major
- List of nearest stars
