= Olin J. Eggen =

American astronomer

Olin Eggen
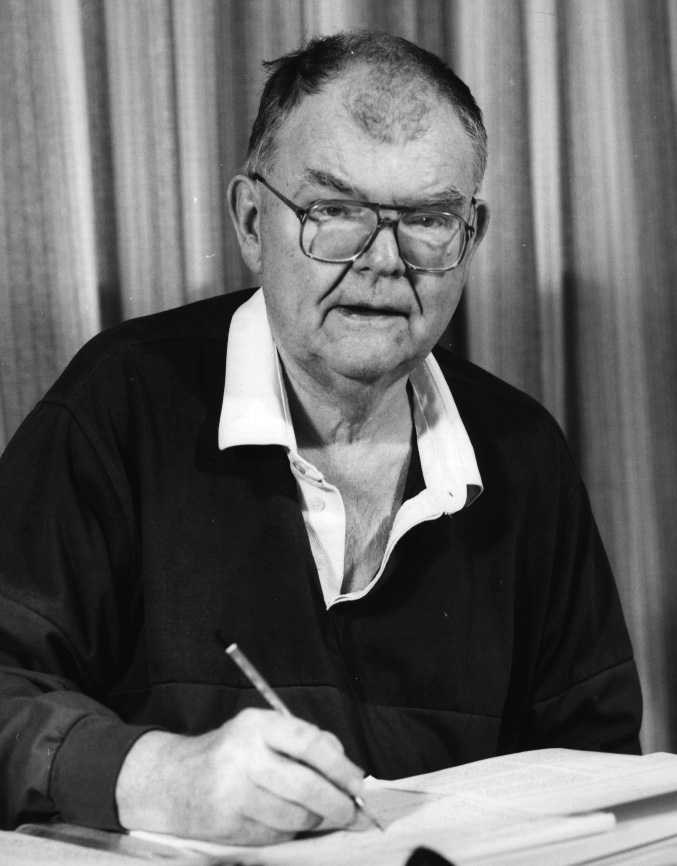
- Born: July 9, 1919; Rock County, Wisconsin
- Died: October 2, 1998 (aged 79); Canberra, Australia
- Education: University of Wisconsin–Madison
- Scientific career
- Doctoral advisor: Albert vector

Olin Jeuck Eggen (July 9, 1919 – October 2, 1998) was an American-Australian astronomer.

== Biography ==
Olin Jeuck Eggen was born to Olin Eggen and Bertha Clare Jeuck in the village of Orfordville located in Rock County, Wisconsin. Both of his parents were of Norwegian extraction. He graduated from the University of Wisconsin–Madison in 1940. After serving in World War II in the OSS, he returned to the university and received his Ph.D. in astrophysics in 1948.

He became known as one of the best observational astronomers of his time. He is best known for a seminal 1962 paper with Donald Lynden-Bell and Allan Sandage which suggested for the first time that the Milky Way Galaxy had collapsed out of a gas cloud. He pioneered the now-accepted notion of moving groups, and introduced the idea that these may originate from dissolved open clusters. For the 1965 book Galactic Structure, edited by Blaauw and Schmidt, Eggen wrote an important chapter on moving groups of stars. He won the Henry Norris Russell Lectureship in 1985.

Over that time he held positions at Lick Observatory (1948–1956), Royal Greenwich Observatory (1956–1961), California Institute of Technology, Mt. Wilson Observatory (1961–1966), Mount Stromlo Observatory, Australian National Observatory (1966–1977), and at Cerro Tololo Inter-American Observatory (1977–1998).

Eggen's professional memberships and honors include the American Astronomical Society's Russell Lectureship (1985), membership in the Royal Astronomical Society (vice president 1961–1962), Pawsey Memorial Lectureship of the Australian Institute of Physics, member of the Astronomical Society of Australia (president 1971–1972), and member of the Astronomical Society of the Pacific.

After his death he was found to have been in possession of highly significant historical files and documents that had apparently gone missing for decades from the Royal Greenwich Observatory, including the "Neptune file". During his lifetime he had always denied having taken the papers or having them in his possession.

The University of Wisconsin-Madison retains a collection of Eggen's personal papers and correspondence. This collection includes material about the large scale developments in post-war astronomy and astrophysics, especially the creation of large (4 meter) optical telescopes in the southern hemisphere. The Eggen Archives are held in the Steenbock Library at University of Wisconsin–Madison Archives.

== Olin J Eggen Scholarship ==
The Olin J Eggen Scholarship was established in 2000 to commemorate Eggen's contributions. The endowment supports a scholarship for international students seeking to pursue PhD research at the Research School of Astronomy and Astrophysics at the Australian National University.

== Selected works ==
- Three-colour photometry of 4000 northern stars (1968)
- Contact binaries, II (1967)
- Colours, luminosities and motions of the nearer giants of types K and M (1966)
- The empirical mass-luminosity relation (1963)
- Space-velocity vectors for 3483 stars with accurately determined proper motion and radial velocity ( 1962)
- Three-colour photometry in the southern hemisphere: NGC 6383, NGC 6405 and standard stars (1961)
- Three-colour photometry of red variables (1961)
