= Van Maanen 2 =

White dwarf in the constellation Pisces

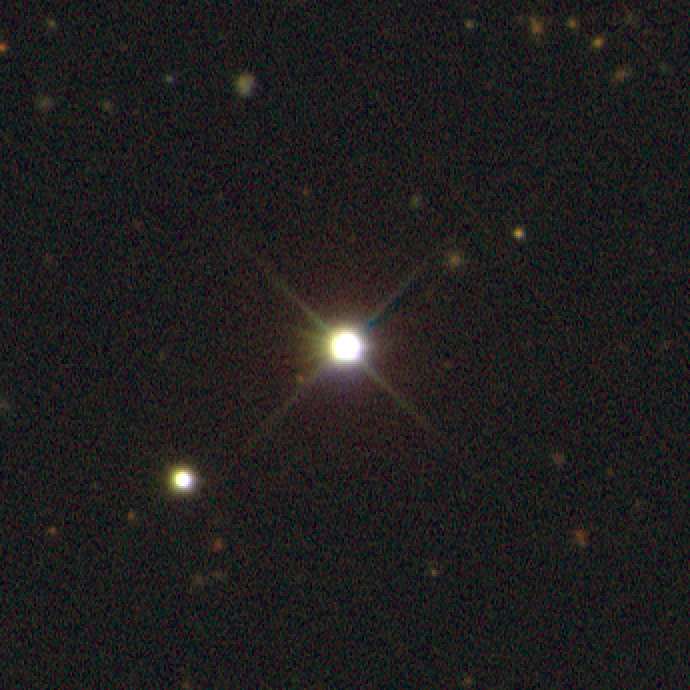
- Van Maanen's Star (bright star in the middle); Credit: SDSS

Observation data Epoch J2000.0 Equinox ICRS
- Constellation: Pisces
- Pronunciation: /vænˈmʌnənz/)
- Right ascension: 00^{h} 49^{m} 09.89834^{s}
- Declination: +05° 23′ 18.9938″
- Apparent magnitude (V): 12.374

Characteristics
- Evolutionary stage: white dwarf
- Spectral type: DZ8
- U−B color index: 0.064
- B−V color index: 0.546
- V−R color index: 0.268
- R−I color index: 0.4

Astrometry
Radial velocity (R_{v})	−12±7 km/s
Proper motion (μ)	RA: +1,231.399 mas/yr Dec.: −2,711.883 mas/yr
Parallax (π)	231.7800±0.0183 mas
Distance	14.072 ± 0.001 ly (4.3144 ± 0.0003 pc)
Absolute magnitude (M_{V})	14.21±0.03

Details
Mass	0.67±0.02 M_{☉}
Radius	0.01129 ± 0.00066 (Note: Applying the Stefan–Boltzmann law with a nominal solar effective temperature of 5,772 K: $$\sqrt{\biggl(\frac{5,772}{6,130}\biggr)^4 \cdot 10^{-3.79}} = 0.01129\ R_\odot$$.) R_{☉}
Luminosity	1.622+0.156 −0.143×10^{−4} L_{☉}
Surface gravity (log g)	8.16±0.03 cgs
Temperature	6,130±110 K
Age	4.1±1.0 (Note: Total age, including main-sequence lifetime) Gyr; 3.17±0.29 (Note: This is the cooling age, i.e. age as a white dwarf only) Gyr

Other designations
- van Maanen's Star, van Maanen 2, vMa2, BD+18°2165, GJ 35, HIP 3829, G 001-027, LFT 76, LHS 7, LTT 10292, WD 0046+051, Wolf 28

Database references
SIMBAD	data
- Location of van Maanen's Star in the constellation Pisces

Van Maanen 2, or van Maanen's Star, is the closest-known solitary white dwarf to the Solar System. It is a dense, compact stellar remnant no longer generating energy through fusion and has equivalent to about 68% of the Sun's mass but only 1% of its radius. At a distance of 14.1 light-years it is the third closest of its type of star after Sirius B and Procyon B, in that order. Discovered in 1917 by Dutch-American astronomer Adriaan van Maanen, Van Maanen 2 was the third white dwarf identified, after 40 Eridani B and Sirius B, and the first solitary example.

== Observation history ==
While searching for a companion to the large proper-motion star Lalande 1299, in 1917 Dutch–American astronomer Adriaan van Maanen discovered this star with an even larger proper motion a few arcminutes to the northeast. He estimated the annual proper motion of the latter as 3 arcseconds. This star had been captured on a plate taken November 11, 1896 for the Carte du Ciel Catalog of Toulouse and it showed an apparent magnitude of 12.3. Prominent absorption features of calcium K-line to H-beta in the spectrum led van Maanen to assign it a spectral classification of F0, and it was initially known as "van Maanen's F star".

In 1918, American astronomer Frederick Seares obtained a refined visual magnitude of 12.34, but the distance to the star remained unknown. Two years later, van Maanen published a parallax estimate of 0.246″, giving it an absolute magnitude of +14.8. This made it the faintest F-type star known at that time. In 1923, Dutch-American astronomer Willem Luyten published a study of stars with large proper motions in which he identified what he called "van Maanen's Star" as one of only three known white dwarfs, a term he coined. These are stars that have an unusually low absolute magnitude for their spectral class, lying well below the main sequence on the Hertzsprung–Russell diagram of stellar temperature versus luminosity.

The high mass density of white dwarfs was demonstrated in 1925 by American astronomer Walter Adams when he measured the gravitational redshift of Sirius B as 21 km/s. In 1926, British astrophysicist Ralph Fowler used the new theory of quantum mechanics to show that these stars are supported by electron gas in a degenerate state. British astrophysicist Leon Mestel demonstrated in 1952 that the energy they emit is the surviving heat from bygone nuclear fusion. He showed that the latter no longer occurs within a white dwarf, and calculated the internal temperature of van Maanen 2 as 6 million K. He gave a preliminary age estimate of 100 billion/A years, where A is the mean atomic weight of the nuclei in the star.

In 2016, it was discovered that a spectrographic plate of the star made in 1917 gives evidence—the earliest known—of planetary matter outside the Solar System, in the form of calcium absorption lines that indicate the presence of planetary material polluting the stellar atmosphere.

== Characteristics ==
Van Maanen 2 is 14.1 light-years (4.3 parsecs) from the Sun in the constellation Pisces, about 2° to the south of the star Delta Piscium, with a relatively high proper motion of 2.978″ annually along a position angle of 155.538°. It is closer to the Sun than any other solitary white dwarf. It is too faint to be seen with the naked eye. Like other white dwarfs, it is a very dense star: its mass has been estimated to be about 67% of the Sun's, yet it has only 1% of the Sun's radius (1.23 times the Earth's radius). The outer atmosphere has a temperature of approximately 6,110 K, which is relatively cool for a white dwarf. As all white dwarfs steadily radiate away their heat over time, this temperature can be used to estimate its age, thought to be around 3.2 billion years.

The progenitor of this white dwarf had an estimated 2.6 solar masses and remained on the main sequence for about 900 million years. This gives the star an overall age of about 4.1 billion years. When this star left the main sequence, it expanded into a red giant that reached a maximum radius of 1,000 times the current radius of the Sun, or about 4.6 astronomical units. Any planets orbiting within this radius would have been engulfed in the star's extent.

The stellar classification of Van Maanen 2 is DZ8, having a helium atmosphere with a significant presence of heavier elements in its spectrum—what astronomers term metals. Indeed, this star is the prototype (archetype in practice) for DZ white dwarfs. Physical models of white dwarfs used by today's astrophysicists show that elements with mass greater than helium would sink, all things being equal, below the photosphere, leaving hydrogen and helium to be visible in the spectrum; for heavier elements to appear here requires a recent external source. It is unlikely that they were obtained from the interstellar medium, since that is primarily composed of hydrogen and helium. Instead, the surface of the star was likely strewn with circumstellar material, such as from the remains of one or more rocky, terrestrial planets. Later observations with the International Ultraviolet Explorer detected calcium, magnesium and iron. This work also detected Lyman-alpha absorption, which shows that hydrogen is present in the atmosphere. Observations with the Very Large Telescope X-shooter and Hubble STIS showed additional polluting elements of chromium, nickel, sodium and silicon.

The total mass of metals in the atmosphere of Van Maanen 2 is estimated to be around 10^{21} g—about the same mass as an asteroid, such as 192 Nausikaa. These pollutants will sink deeper into the atmosphere on time scales of around three million years, which indicates the material is being replenished at a rate of 10^{7} g/s. These materials could have been accreted in the form of multiple planetesimals smaller than around 84 km colliding with the star.

White dwarfs with a spectrum that indicates high levels of metal contamination of the photosphere often have a circumstellar disk. In the case of van Maanen 2, observations at a wavelength of 24 μm do not show the infrared excess that might be generated by a dusty disk. Instead there is a noticeable deficit. The predicted flux at 24 μm is 0.23 mJy, whereas the measured value is 0.11 ± 0.03 mJy. This deficit may be explained by collision-induced absorption in the atmosphere of the star, as seen in certain white dwarfs that have temperatures below 4,000 K, as a result of collisions between hydrogen molecules or between hydrogen molecules and helium.

A paper published in 2015 found that, based upon the space velocity of this star, it made the closest approach 15,070 years ago as then it was 3.1 light-years (0.95 pc) from the Sun, although it uses an outdated and unreliable radial velocity measurement.

== Possible companion ==
The possibility of a substellar companion remains uncertain. As of 2004, one paper claimed detection of this, while another discounted this. As of 2008, observations with the Spitzer Space Telescope appear to rule out any companions within 1,200 AU of the star that have four Jupiter masses or greater. No potential proper motion companions have been identified between an angular separation of 5 arcseconds out to 10°, ruling out objects with a mass of 75 M_{J} or greater.

As of 2022, a candidate planet was detected via astrometry, with a mass between 0.4 and 1.1 Jupiter masses.

== See also ==
- List of white dwarfs
- List of exoplanets and planetary debris around white dwarfs
- List of nearest stars
- Stars named after people
