= 40 Eridani =

Triple star system in the constellation Eridanus

40 Eridani / Keid
- Location of 40 Eridani (circled)

Observation data Epoch J2000.0 Equinox ICRS
- Constellation: Eridanus
- 40 Eridani A
- Right ascension: 04^{h} 15^{m} 16.31962^{s}
- Declination: −07° 39′ 10.3308″
- Apparent magnitude (V): 4.43
- 40 Eridani B
- Right ascension: 04^{h} 15^{m} 21.79572^{s}
- Declination: −07° 39′ 29.2040″
- Apparent magnitude (V): 9.52
- 40 Eridani C
- Right ascension: 04^{h} 15^{m} 21.53600^{s}
- Declination: −07° 39′ 20.6946″
- Apparent magnitude (V): 11.17

Characteristics

40 Eridani A
- Evolutionary stage: main sequence
- Spectral type: K0.5V
- U−B color index: +0.45
- B−V color index: +0.82

40 Eridani B
- Evolutionary stage: white dwarf
- Spectral type: DA4
- U−B color index: +0.45
- B−V color index: +0.03

40 Eridani C
- Evolutionary stage: main sequence
- Spectral type: M4.5Ve
- U−B color index: +0.83
- B−V color index: +1.67
- Variable type: Flare star

Astrometry

40 Eridani A
| Radial velocity (R_{v}) | −42.47±0.12 km/s |
| Proper motion (μ) | RA: −2,240.085 mas/yr Dec.: −3,421.809 mas/yr |
| Parallax (π) | 199.6080±0.1208 mas |
| Distance | 16.340 ± 0.010 ly (5.010 ± 0.003 pc) |
| Absolute magnitude (M_{V}) | 5.93 |

40 Eridani B
| Radial velocity (R_{v}) | −21 km/s |
| Proper motion (μ) | RA: −2,236.169 mas/yr Dec.: −3,338.955 mas/yr |
| Parallax (π) | 199.6911±0.0512 mas |
| Distance | 16.333 ± 0.004 ly (5.008 ± 0.001 pc) |

40 Eridani C
| Radial velocity (R_{v}) | −44.06±0.20 km/s |
| Proper motion (μ) | RA: −2,247.183 mas/yr Dec.: −3,409.824 mas/yr |
| Parallax (π) | 199.4516±0.0692 mas |
| Distance | 16.353 ± 0.006 ly (5.014 ± 0.002 pc) |

Orbit
| Primary | 40 Eridani A |
| Secondary | 40 Eridani BC |
| Period (P) | ~8,000 yr |
| Semi-major axis (a) | ~400 AU |

Orbit
| Primary | 40 Eridani B |
| Secondary | 40 Eridani C |
| Period (P) | 233.20±0.65 yr |
| Semi-major axis (a) | 6.88788±0.03488" (34.5 AU (Note: Semi-major axis in AU = $\frac{semimajor\ axis\ in\ seconds}{parallax\ in\ seconds}\ {{=}}\ \frac{6.88788}{.1996911}$ = 34.4927 AU; as the eccentricity is 0.41, the distance fluctuates between 59% and 141% of that, roughly from 20.4 AU to 48.6 AU.)) |
| Eccentricity (e) | 0.4141±0.0072 |
| Inclination (i) | 107.98±0.36° |
| Longitude of the node (Ω) | 151.58±0.20° |
| Periastron epoch (T) | 1848.7888±1.2888 |
| Argument of periastron (ω) (secondary) | 321.2±1.3° |

Details

40 Eridani A
| Mass | 0.78±0.08 M_{☉} |
| Radius | 0.804±0.006 R_{☉} |
| Luminosity | 0.4±0.01 L_{☉} |
| Surface gravity (log g) | 4.35±0.1 cgs |
| Temperature | 5126±30 K |
| Metallicity [Fe/H] | −0.36±0.02 dex |
| Rotation | ~37–43 days |
| Rotational velocity (v sin i) | 1.23 ± 0.28 km/s |
| Age | 6.9±4.7 Gyr |

40 Eridani B
| Mass | 0.558±0.012 M_{☉} |
| Radius | 0.01308±0.00020 R_{☉} |
| Luminosity | 0.01349±0.00054 L_{☉} |
| Surface gravity (log g) | 7.957±0.020 cgs |
| Temperature | 17,200±110 K |
| Age | 1.8 Gyr |

40 Eridani C
| Mass | 0.1980±0.0042 M_{☉} |
| Radius | 0.274±0.011 R_{☉} |
| Luminosity | 0.00651±0.00013 L_{☉} |
| Surface gravity (log g) | ~5.5 cgs |
| Temperature | 3,167±60 K |
| Rotation | 137.4±4.0 days |

Other designations
- ο^{2} Eri, 40 Eri, GJ 166, ADS 3093, CCDM J04153-0739
- A: Keid, BD−07°780, HD 26965, HIP 19849, HR 1325, SAO 131063, LHS 23, LTT 1907
- B: BD−07°781, HD 26976, SAO 131065, G 160-060, LHS 24, LTT 1908
- C: DY Eri, BD−07°781 C, LHS 25, LTT 1909

Database references
| SIMBAD | A |
- B
- C
| Exoplanet Archive | data |

40 Eridani is a triple star system in the constellation of Eridanus, abbreviated 40 Eri. It has the Bayer designation Omicron^{2} Eridani, which is Latinized from ο^{2} Eridani and abbreviated Omicron^{2} Eri or ο^{2} Eri. Based on parallax measurements taken by the Gaia mission, it is about 16.3 light-years (5.0 parsecs) from the Sun.

The primary star of the system, designated 40 Eridani A and formally named Keid, is easily visible to the naked eye, with an apparent magnitude of 4.43. It is orbited by a binary pair whose two components are designated 40 Eridani B and C, and which were discovered on January 31, 1783, by William Herschel. It was again observed by Friedrich Struve in 1825 and by Otto Struve in 1851.

In 1910, it was discovered that although 40 Eridani B was a faint star, it was white in color. This meant that it had to be a small star; in fact it was a white dwarf, the first discovered. Although it is neither the closest white dwarf, nor the brightest in the night sky, it is by far the easiest to observe; it is nearly three magnitudes brighter than Van Maanen's Star, the nearest solitary white dwarf, and unlike the companions of Procyon and Sirius it is not outshone by the glare of a much brighter primary.

== Nomenclature ==
40 Eridani is the system's Flamsteed designation and ο^{2} Eridani (Latinised to Omicron^{2} Eridani) is its Bayer designation. The designations of the sub-components – 40 Eridani A, B and C – derive from the convention used by the Washington Multiplicity Catalog (WMC) for multiple star systems, and adopted by the International Astronomical Union (IAU). 40 Eridani C also bears the variable star designation DY Eridani.

The system bore the traditional name Keid derived from the Arabic word القيض (alqayḍ) meaning "the eggshells", alluding to its neighbour Beid (Arabic "egg"). In 2016, the IAU organized a Working Group on Star Names (WGSN) to catalogue and standardize proper names for stars. The WGSN decided to attribute proper names to individual stars rather than entire multiple systems. It approved the name Keid for the component 40 Eridani A on 12 September 2016 and it is now so included in the List of IAU-approved Star Names.

== Properties ==
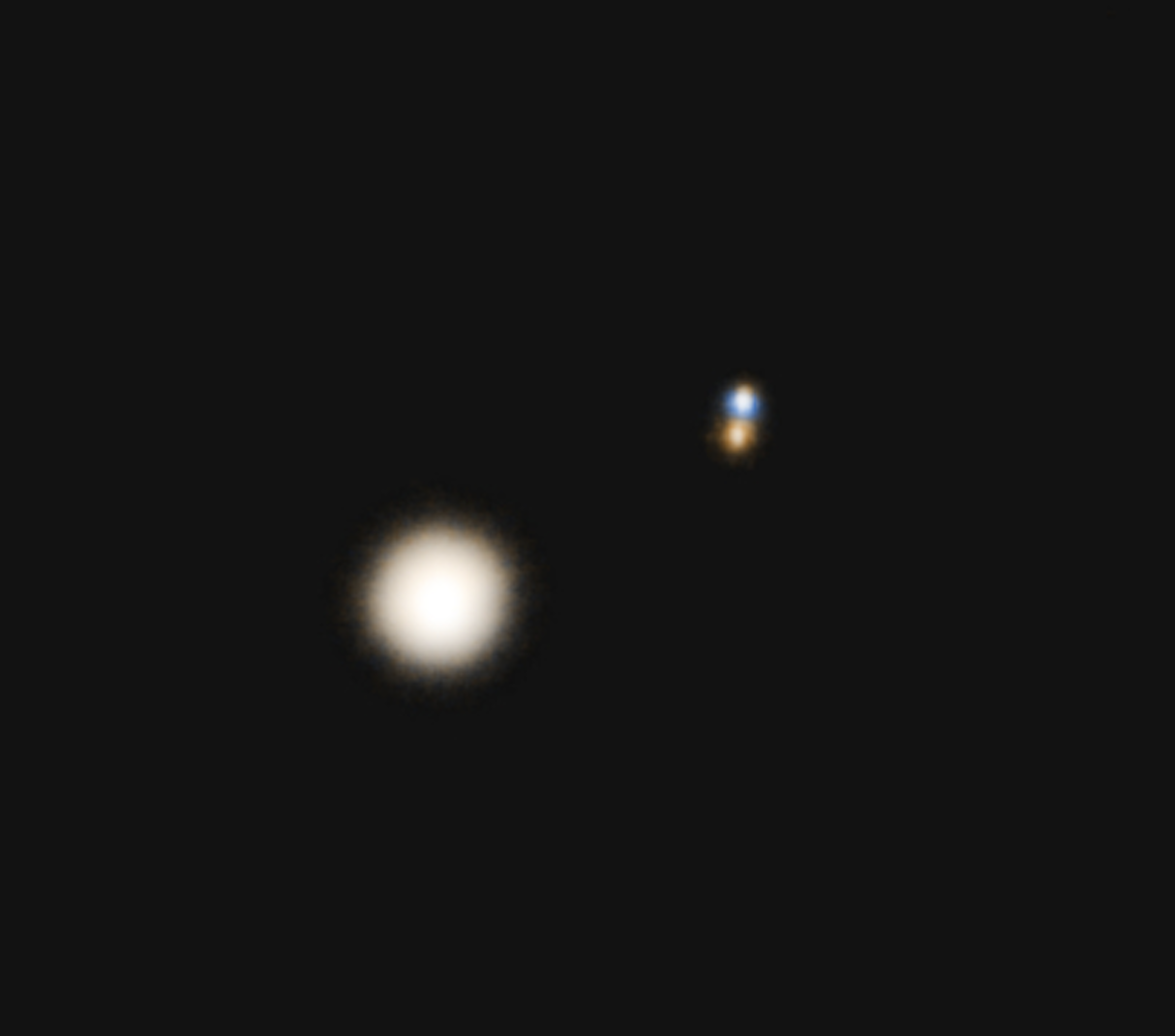
Amateur photo of 40 Eridani, with B and C visually close to each other

40 Eridani A is a main-sequence dwarf of spectral type K0.5, 40 Eridani B is a 9th magnitude white dwarf of spectral type DA4, and 40 Eridani C is an 11th magnitude red dwarf flare star of spectral type M4.5e. When component B was a main-sequence star, it is thought to have been the most massive member of the system at 1.8 M_{☉}, but ejected much of its mass before it became a white dwarf. B and C orbit each other approximately 400 AU from the primary star, A. Their orbit has a semimajor axis of 35 AU and is rather elliptical with an orbital eccentricity of 0.410.

=== Potential for life ===
The habitable zone of 40 Eridani A, where a planet could exist with liquid water, is near 0.68 AU from A. At this distance a planet would complete a revolution in 223 Earth days (according Kepler's third law) and 40 Eridani A would appear nearly 20% (Note: From $\ h = \frac{\ a\ }{d} \,,$ where h is the apparent height, d is the distance of the object, and a is the actual size of the object.) wider than the Sun does on Earth. An observer on a planet in the 40 Eridani A system would see the B–C pair as unusually bright white and reddish-orange stars in the night sky – magnitudes −8 and −6, slightly brighter than the appearance of Venus seen from Earth as the evening star.

It is unlikely that habitable planets exist around 40 Eridani B because they would have been sterilized by its evolution into a white dwarf. As for 40 Eridani C, it is prone to flares, which cause large momentary increases in the emission of X-rays and visible light. This would be lethal to Earth-type life on planets near the flare star.

== Search for planets ==
40 Eridani A shows periodic radial velocity variations, which were suggested to be caused by a planetary companion. The 42-day period is close to the stellar rotation period, which made the possible planetary nature of the signal difficult to confirm. A 2018 study found that most evidence supports a planetary origin for the signal, but this was controversial, with a 2021 study characterizing the signal as a false positive, and a 2022 study getting inconclusive results. Further studies in 2023 and 2024 concluded that the radial velocity signal very likely does originate from stellar activity, and not from a planet.

The candidate planet would have had a minimum mass of 8.47±0.47 M_{🜨}, and lie considerably interior to the habitable zone, receiving nine times more stellar flux than Earth, which is an even greater amount than Mercury, the innermost planet in the Solar System, on average receives from the Sun.

== Appearance of the Solar System ==
As seen from the 40 Eridani system, the Sun is a 3.4-magnitude star in Hercules, near the border with Serpens Caput. (Note: From 40 Eridani the Sun would appear on the diametrically opposite side of the sky at the coordinates RA=16^{h} 15^{m} 16.32^{s}, Dec=07° 39′ 10.34″, which is located near the border of Hercules (constellation) and Serpens Caput, the closest bright star being Alpha Serpentis. The absolute magnitude of the Sun is 4.85, so, at a distance of 5.04 parsecs, the Sun would have an apparent magnitude $\begin{smallmatrix}m\ =\ M_v\ +\ 5\cdot((\log_{10}\ 5.04)\ -\ 1)\ =\ 3.36\end{smallmatrix}$.)

== In fiction ==
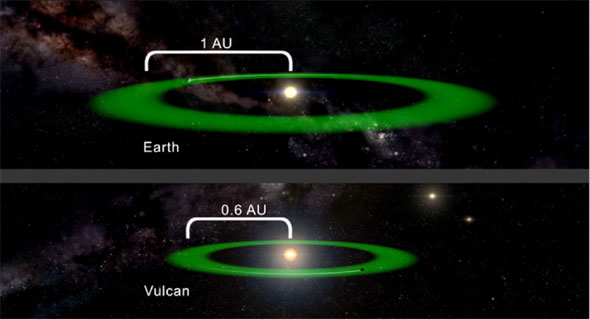
Habitable zone compared to that of the Solar System, with the fictional planet Vulcan in Star Trek

In the Star Trek franchise, the planet Vulcan orbits 40 Eridani A. Vulcan has been referenced in relation to the real-life search for exoplanets in this system.

The hypothetical planet 40 Eridani A b is also mentioned in the book Project Hail Mary as the home of the eponymous Eridian species. The planet is called "Erid" in both the book and its 2026 film adaptation.

In the Dune franchise, 40 Eridani A has an inhabited and technologically advanced planet called Richese. The Dune Encyclopedia places the similarly advanced planet Ix in the 40 Eridani A system.

In the Bobiverse series by Dennis E. Taylor, a double planet is found orbiting 40 Eridani A, and named Vulcan and Romulus by an uploaded intelligence in a von Neumann probe.

== See also ==
- List of nearest K-type stars
