= Gamma Piscium =

G-type giant star in the constellation Pisces

γ Piscium
- Location of γ Piscium (circled)

Observation data Epoch J2000 Equinox ICRS
- Constellation: Pisces
- Right ascension: 23^{h} 17^{m} 09.937^{s}
- Declination: +03° 16′ 56.25″
- Apparent magnitude (V): 3.699

Characteristics
- Evolutionary stage: Horizontal branch
- Spectral type: G8 III
- U−B color index: +0.572
- B−V color index: +0.924

Astrometry
Radial velocity (R_{v})	−13.6 km/s
Proper motion (μ)	RA: 759.268 mas/yr Dec.: 17.568 mas/yr
Parallax (π)	24.1958±0.2967 mas
Distance	135 ± 2 ly (41.3 ± 0.5 pc)
Absolute magnitude (M_{V})	0.68±0.08

Details
Mass	0.97±0.12 M_{☉}
Radius	11.28±0.10 R_{☉}
Luminosity	62.7±3.3 L_{☉}
Surface gravity (log g)	2.43 ± 0.06 cgs
Temperature	4833±62 K
Metallicity [Fe/H]	−0.51 dex
Age	~12 Gyr

Other designations
- Yunyu, Gamma Psc, γ Piscium, γ Psc, 6 Piscium, BD+02°4648, FK5 878, GC 32415, HD 219615, HIP 114971, HR 8852, SAO 128085, PPM 173938, 2MASS J23170996+0316563

Database references
SIMBAD	data
Exoplanet Archive	data

Gamma Piscium, also named Yunyu, is a star approximately 135 light-years away from Earth in the equatorial-northern zodiac constellation of Pisces. It is a yellow star with a spectral type of G8 III, meaning it has a surface temperature of 4,833 K and is a giant star. It is slightly cooler than the Sun, yet it is 11 solar radii in size and shines with the light of 63 Suns. The star is a member of the red clump, which means it is undergoing core helium fusion. At an apparent magnitude of 3.7, it is the second brightest star in the constellation Pisces, between Eta and Alpha.

== Naming ==
Gamma Piscium (Latinized from γ Piscium) is the star's Bayer designation.

In Chinese astronomy, 霹靂 (Pī Lì), meaning Thunderbolt, refers to an asterism consisting of γ Piscium, β Piscium, θ Piscium, ι Piscium and ω Piscium. Consequently, the Chinese name for γ Piscium itself is 霹靂二 (Pī Lì èr, English: the Second Star of Thunderbolt.) However, many of the Chinese constellations have changed over time, and γ Piscium was originally part of Yún Yǔ (Cloud and Rain, 雲雨). The IAU Working Group on Star Names approved the name Yunyu for this star on 17 September 2026; the name Pili was assigned to ω Piscium.

== Properties ==
Gamma Piscium moves across the sky at three-quarters of an arcsecond per year, which at 135 light years corresponds to 153 kilometers per second. This suggests it is a visitor from another part of the Milky Way Galaxy; in astronomical terms, it will quickly leave the vicinity of the Sun. Its metallicity is only one-fourth that of the Sun, and visitors from outside the thin disk that composes the Milky Way tend to be metal-poor. Gamma Piscium is part of the asterism known as the "circlet of Pisces."

== Planetary system ==
In 2021, a gas giant planet was detected by the radial velocity method.

The Gamma Piscium planetary system
Companion (in order from star)	Mass	Semimajor axis (AU)	Orbital period (days)	Eccentricity	Inclination (°)	Radius
b	>1.34^{+0.02}_{−0.31} M_{J}	1.32^{+0.05}_{−0.08}	555.1^{+6.0}_{−2.5}	0.204^{+0.114}_{−0.141}	—	—
