= Revati (disambiguation) =

Revati in Hinduism, is the daughter of King Kakudmi and the wife of Balarama, the elder brother of Krishna.

Revati may also refer to:

- Revati (raga), a musical scale Carnatic music
- Revati (nakshatra), nakshatra or lunar mansion in Vedic astrology, referring to the multiple star system Zeta Piscium
- Revathi (1986 film), a 1986 Indian film
- Revati (film), a 2005 Indian film
- Revathi Pattathanam, an annual assembly of scholars held in Kerala, India
- Revathi (born 1966), award-winning South Indian actress
- Sandhya (actress, born 1988), born Revathi, Indian actress
- Revathi Pillai, Indian actress
- Revathi Sankaran, Indian television personality and actress
- Revati, the proper name of the brightest component of the multiple star system Zeta Piscium
