= List of star names in Pisces =

U This is the list of the proper names for the stars in the constellation Pisces, as used in modern western astronomy and uranography.

== List ==
star	proper name	derivation
α Psc	Alrescha	Arabic
β Psc	Fumalsamakah	Arabic
γ Psc	Yunyu	Chinese
δ Psc	Waiping	Chinese
ζ Psc	Revati and Paushna	Sanskrit
η Psc	Alpherg	Arabic
ι Psc	Puwuh Atarung	Balinese
ο Psc	Torcular	Latin
π Psc	Idigna	Sumerian
ω Psc	Pili	Chinese

== Etymologies ==
=== α Psc ===
- Alrescha (Al Rescha, Al Richa, Alrischa, Al Rischa, Alrisha, El Rischa):

＜ (ar) al-rishā’ , "the cord" ＜ (ind.-ar) al-Rishā’, "the Rope (of the well-Bucket)", for β And. Later, wrongly transferred to this star.

- Okda:

＜ (ar) ‘uqdah, "knot" ＜ (scientific Arabic) ‘aqd al-khayṭayn, "the knot of the cord", for this star.

- Kaitain:

＜ (ar) khayṭayn, "cord" ＜ (scientific Arabic) ‘aqd al-khayṭayn, for this star.

=== β Psc ===
- Fumalsamakah:

＜ (scientific Arabic) fam al-Samakah, "the mouth of the Fish", for this star.

=== η Psc ===
- Alpherg:

＜ (ar) al-farg, "the beak-shaped spout (of the well-Bucket)", ＜ (indigenous Arabic) al-farg al-Muqaddam, "the Fore Spout", for β and α Peg as 24th Arabic lunar mansion, or al-farg al-Mu'akhkhar, "the Rear Spout", for α And and γ Peg as 25th Aerabic lunar mansion, later erroneously transferred to this star.

- Kullat Nūnu:

The star had an obscure Babylonian name Kullat Nūnu−the latter being the Babylonian word for fish and the former "Kullat" referring to either a bucket or the cord that ties the fish together.

=== ο Psc ===
- Torcular :

＜ (la) torcularis septentrionalis, "northern press".

== See also ==
- List of stars in Pisces
- List of star names
