= Theta Piscium =

Star in the constellation Pisces

- Location of θ Piscium (circled)

Observation data Epoch J2000.0 Equinox ICRS
- Constellation: Pisces
- Right ascension: 23^{h} 27^{m} 58.09529^{s}
- Declination: +06° 22′ 44.3720″
- Apparent magnitude (V): 4.27

Characteristics
- Evolutionary stage: red clump
- Spectral type: K1 III
- U−B color index: +1.00
- B−V color index: +1.062

Astrometry
Radial velocity (R_{v})	+6.05±0.19 km/s
Proper motion (μ)	RA: −123.83 mas/yr Dec.: −43.26 mas/yr
Parallax (π)	21.96±0.25 mas
Distance	149 ± 2 ly (45.5 ± 0.5 pc)
Absolute magnitude (M_{V})	+0.83

Details
Mass	1.58 M_{☉}
Radius	11 R_{☉}
Luminosity	51.3 L_{☉}
Surface gravity (log g)	2.70 cgs
Temperature	4,684±23 K
Metallicity [Fe/H]	0.06 dex
Rotational velocity (v sin i)	3.1 km/s
Age	2.45 Myr

Other designations
- θ Psc, 10 Piscium, BD+05°5173, FK5 1614, GC 32647, HD 220954, HIP 115830, HR 8916, SAO 128196, PPM 174110

Database references
SIMBAD	data

Theta Piscium, Latinized from θ Piscium, is a single, orange-hued star in the zodiac constellation of Pisces, the fish. The annual parallax shift of this star was measured during the Hipparcos mission as 21.96 mas, which yields a distance estimate of about 149 light years. It is a faint star but visible to the naked eye with an apparent visual magnitude of 4.27. The star is moving away from the Sun with a radial velocity of +6 km/s.

At the estimated age of 2.5 billion years, this is an aging giant star with a stellar classification of K1 III, which means it has exhausted the supply of hydrogen at its core. It is a red clump star, indicating it is on the horizontal branch of its evolution and is generating energy through helium fusion at its core. Theta Piscium has 158% of the Sun's mass and its outer atmosphere has swollen to about 11 times the girth of the Sun. It is brighter yet cooler than the Sun, radiating 51.3 times the Sun's luminosity from its enlarged photosphere at an effective temperature of about 4,684 K.

== Naming ==
In Chinese, 霹靂 (Pī Lì), meaning Thunderbolt, refers to an asterism consisting of refers to an asterism consisting of θ Piscium, β Piscium, γ Piscium, ι Piscium and ω Piscium. Consequently, the Chinese name for θ Piscium itself is 霹靂三 (Pī Lì sān, English: the Third Star of Thunderbolt.)
