= Mu Piscium =

Star in the constellation Pisces

- Location of μ Piscium (circled)

Observation data Epoch J2000.0 Equinox J2000.0 (ICRS)
- Constellation: Pisces
- Right ascension: 01^{h} 30^{m} 11.11444^{s}
- Declination: +06° 08′ 37.7577″
- Apparent magnitude (V): +4.84

Characteristics
- Spectral type: K4 III
- B−V color index: 1.38

Astrometry
Radial velocity (R_{v})	+34.19 km/s
Proper motion (μ)	RA: +292.00 mas/yr Dec.: −45.95 mas/yr
Parallax (π)	10.73±0.19 mas
Distance	304 ± 5 ly (93 ± 2 pc)
Absolute magnitude (M_{V})	−0.37

Details
Mass	1.25 M_{☉}
Radius	37 R_{☉}
Luminosity	186 L_{☉}
Surface gravity (log g)	2.07 cgs
Temperature	4,126±27 K
Metallicity [Fe/H]	−0.39 dex
Rotational velocity (v sin i)	1.0 km/s
Age	5.57 Gyr

Other designations
- μ Psc, 98 Piscium, BD+05°194, FK5 2099, HD 9138, HIP 7007, HR 434, SAO 109926, WDS J01302+0609A

Database references
SIMBAD	data

Mu Piscium (μ Piscium) is a solitary, orange-hued star in the zodiac constellation of Pisces. It is visible to the naked eye with an apparent visual magnitude of 4.84. Based upon an annual parallax shift of 10.73 mas as seen from Earth, it is located about 304 light years from the Sun. Given this distance, it has a relatively high proper motion, advancing 296 mas per year across the sky.

This is an evolved K-type giant star with a stellar classification of K4 III. It has an estimated 1.25 times the mass of the Sun and, at the age of 5.6 billion years, has expanded to about 37 times the Sun's radius. From this enlarged photosphere, it is radiating 186 times the Sun's luminosity at an effective temperature of 4,126 K. It has a magnitude 12.02 visual companion at an angular separation of 209.30 arc seconds along a position angle of 298°, as of 2012.

== Naming ==
In Chinese, 外屏 (Wài Píng), meaning Outer Fence, refers to an asterism consisting of μ Piscium, δ Piscium, ε Piscium, ζ Piscium, ν Piscium, ξ Piscium and α Piscium. Consequently, the Chinese name for μ Piscium itself is 外屏四 (Wài Píng sì, English: the Fourth Star of Outer Fence.)
