= Xi Piscium =

Binary star system in the constellation Pisces

- Location of ξ Piscium (circled)

Observation data Epoch J2000.0 Equinox J2000.0 (ICRS)
- Constellation: Pisces
- Right ascension: 01^{h} 52^{m} 33.34^{s}
- Declination: +03° 11′ 15.1″
- Apparent magnitude (V): 4.60

Characteristics
- Evolutionary stage: red clump
- Spectral type: K0 III
- U−B color index: +0.74
- B−V color index: +0.95

Astrometry
Radial velocity (R_{v})	+26.13 km/s
Proper motion (μ)	RA: +32.687 mas/yr Dec.: +25.146 mas/yr
Parallax (π)	16.6641±0.2416 mas
Distance	196 ± 3 ly (60.0 ± 0.9 pc)
Absolute magnitude (M_{V})	+0.78

Orbit
Period (P)	1672.4±1.4 d
Eccentricity (e)	0.18±0.03
Periastron epoch (T)	2437651 ± 40 JD
Argument of periastron (ω) (secondary)	71±9°
Semi-amplitude (K_{1}) (primary)	4.64±0.14 km/s

Details

ξ Psc A
Mass	2.00 M_{☉}
Radius	9 R_{☉}
Luminosity	45.7 L_{☉}
Surface gravity (log g)	2.8 cgs
Temperature	4,947±25 K
Metallicity [Fe/H]	−0.11 dex
Rotational velocity (v sin i)	0.0 km/s
Age	1.22 Gyr

Other designations
- ξ Psc, ξ Psc, 111 Piscium, BD+02°290, FK5 65, HD 11559, HIP 8833, HR 549, SAO 110206, WDS J02020+246AB

Database references
SIMBAD	data

Xi Piscium (ξ Piscium) is an orange-hued binary star system in the zodiac constellation of Pisces. In 1690, the astronomer Johannes Hevelius in his Firmamentum Sobiescianum regarded the constellation Pisces as being composed of four subdivisions. Xi Piscium was considered to be part of the Linum Austrinum, the South Cord. The star is visible to the naked eye, having an apparent visual magnitude of 4.60. Based upon an annual parallax shift of 16.7 mas as seen from Earth, it is located about 196 light years from the Sun. It is moving away from the Sun, having a radial velocity of +26 km/s.

This is a single-lined spectroscopic binary system with an orbital period of 4.6 years and an eccentricity of around 0.18. The spectroscopic binary nature of this star was discovered in 1901 by William Wallace Campbell using the Mills spectrograph at the Lick Observatory. The visible component is an evolved K-type giant star with a stellar classification of K0 III. It is a red clump star, which indicates it is generating energy through helium fusion at its core.

== In non-Western astronomy ==
In Chinese astronomy, the "Outer Fence" (Chinese: 外屏; pinyin: Wài Píng) refers to an asterism consisting of ξ Piscium, δ Piscium, ε Piscium, ζ Piscium, μ Piscium, ν Piscium and α Piscium. Consequently, the Chinese name for ξ Piscium itself is "the Sixth Star of the Outer Fence" (Chinese: 外屏六; pinyin: Wài Píng liù)
