= Nu Piscium =

Star in the constellation Pisces

ν Piscium
- Location of ν Piscium (circled)

Observation data Epoch J2000.0 Equinox J2000.0 (ICRS)
- Constellation: Pisces
- Right ascension: 01^{h} 41^{m} 25.89414^{s}
- Declination: +05° 29′ 15.4018″
- Apparent magnitude (V): 4.44

Characteristics
- Evolutionary stage: red giant branch
- Spectral type: K3 IIIb
- B−V color index: 1.37
- Variable type: Oscillating Red Giant

Astrometry
| Radial velocity (R_{v}) | 0.6±0.18 km/s |
| Proper motion (μ) | RA: −23.323 mas/yr Dec.: 3.505 mas/yr |
| Parallax (π) | 8.9275±0.1567 mas |
| Distance | 365 ± 6 ly (112 ± 2 pc) |
| Absolute magnitude (M_{V}) | −0.78 |

Details

ν Psc A
| Mass | 1.66 M_{☉} |
| Radius | 34.58+0.81 −0.83 R_{☉} |
| Luminosity | 380 L_{☉} |
| Surface gravity (log g) | 1.91 cgs |
| Temperature | 4,154 K |
| Metallicity [Fe/H] | −0.16 dex |
| Age | 3.41 Gyr |

Other designations
- ν Psc, 106 Piscium, BD+04°293, FK5 56, HD 10380, HIP 7884, HR 489, SAO 110065

Database references
| SIMBAD | data |

Nu Piscium (ν Piscium) is an orange-hued binary star system in the zodiac constellation of Pisces. Prior to the formation of the modern constellation boundaries in 1930, it was designated 51 Ceti in the constellation Cetus. Nu Piscium is visible to the naked eye, having a combined apparent visual magnitude of 4.44. Based upon an annual parallax shift of 8.93 mas as seen from Earth, it is located about 365 light years from the Sun.

The primary, component A, is an evolved, K-type giant star with a stellar classification of K3 IIIb. It is a weak barium star, indicating that the atmosphere was previously enriched by accretion of s-process elements from what is now a white dwarf companion. The giant has 1.66 times the mass of the Sun and has expanded to about 35 times the Sun's radius. It is about 3.4 billion years old and is radiating 380 times the Sun's luminosity from its photosphere at an effective temperature of 4,154 K.

In 2026 the star was discovered to be an ORG (Oscillating Red Giant) variable by the Italian amateur research group GrAG (Gruppo Astrofili Galileo Galilei APS).

== Naming ==
In Chinese, 外屏 (Wài Píng), meaning Outer Fence, refers to an asterism consisting of ν Piscium, δ Piscium, ε Piscium, ζ Piscium, μ Piscium, ξ Piscium and α Piscium. Consequently, the Chinese name for ν Piscium itself is 外屏五 (Wài Píng wu, English: the Fifth Star of Outer Fence.)
