= Iota Piscium =

F-type main sequence star in the constellation Pisces

- Location of ι Piscium (circled in red)

Observation data Epoch J2000.0 Equinox ICRS
- Constellation: Pisces
- Right ascension: 23^{h} 39^{m} 57.04138^{s}
- Declination: +05° 37′ 34.6475″
- Apparent magnitude (V): 4.13

Characteristics
- Evolutionary stage: Main sequence
- Spectral type: F7 V
- U−B color index: −0.01
- B−V color index: +0.50

Astrometry
Radial velocity (R_{v})	+5.4 km/s
Proper motion (μ)	RA: 377.15±0.19 mas/yr Dec.: −437.43±0.15 mas/yr
Parallax (π)	72.92±0.15 mas
Distance	44.73 ± 0.09 ly (13.71 ± 0.03 pc)
Absolute magnitude (M_{V})	3.43

Details
Mass	1.21±0.04 M_{☉}
Radius	1.587±0.013 R_{☉}
Luminosity	3.554±0.061 L_{☉}
Surface gravity (log g)	4.4±0.3 cgs
Temperature	6,403±64 K
Metallicity [Fe/H]	−0.11±0.06 dex
Rotation	9 days
Rotational velocity (v sin i)	6.67 km/s
Age	3.7±0.6 Gyr

Other designations
- Puwuh Atarung, ι Psc, 17 Psc, BD+04°5035, FK5 892, GC 32879, GJ 904, HD 222368, HIP 116771, HR 8969, SAO 128310, PPM 174312, CCDM J23399+0538A, WDS J23399+0538A, IDS 23348+0505 A

Database references
SIMBAD	data

Iota Piscium, also named Puwuh Atarung, is a star located in the constellation Pisces. With an apparent magnitude of +4.13, it is visible to the naked eye. Parallax measurements give a distance of 44.73 light-years.

== Naming ==
Iota Piscium (Latinized from ι Piscium, abbreviated Iota Psc, ι Psc) is the star's Bayer designation. In Chinese astronomy, 霹靂 (Pī Lì), meaning Thunderbolt, refers to an asterism consisting of ι Piscium, β Piscium, γ Piscium, θ Piscium, and ω Piscium. Consequently, the Chinese name for ι Piscium itself is 霹靂四 (Pī Lì sì, English: the Fourth Star of Thunderbolt.)

Puwuh Atarung (ᬧᬸᬯᬸᬄᬳᬢᬭᬸᬂ), meaning "battling quails", is a Balinese constellation visualized in Pisces. The IAU Working Group on Star Names adopted the name Puwuh Atarung for this star on 17 September 2026.

== Properties ==
Its spectral type is F7V, with the luminosity class V suggesting it is in the main sequence, fusing atoms of hydrogen into helium. The star is 3.7 billion years old, has 1.21 times the Sun's mass and 1.59 times the Sun's radius. It is radiating 3.55 times the Sun's luminosity at an effective temperature of 6,403 K. It is a suspected variable star.

The star was once thought to have one or two stellar companions, but both are line-of-sight coincidences. However, it has a candidate proper motion companion with a separation of 8.48". It displays a far-infrared excess at a wavelength of 70μm, suggesting it is being orbited by a cold debris disk.
