= Delta Piscium =

Star in the constellation Pisces

δ Piscium
- Location of δ Piscium (circled)

Observation data Epoch J2000.0 Equinox J2000.0 (ICRS)
- Constellation: Pisces
- Right ascension: 00^{h} 48^{m} 40.9443^{s}
- Declination: +07° 35′ 06.295″
- Apparent magnitude (V): +4.416

Characteristics
- Evolutionary stage: red giant branch
- Spectral type: K4 IIIb
- U−B color index: +1.831
- B−V color index: +1.500

Astrometry
Radial velocity (R_{v})	+32.45±0.18 km/s
Proper motion (μ)	RA: +81.994 mas/yr Dec.: −50.232 mas/yr
Parallax (π)	10.8577±0.1787 mas
Distance	300 ± 5 ly (92 ± 2 pc)
Absolute magnitude (M_{V})	−0.46

Details
Mass	1.65 M_{☉}
Radius	38.01+0.71 −0.73 R_{☉}
Luminosity	291.7±13.3 L_{☉}
Surface gravity (log g)	1.88 cgs
Temperature	3868±35 K
Metallicity [Fe/H]	−0.19 dex
Rotational velocity (v sin i)	5.5 km/s
Age	2.98 Gyr

Other designations
- Waiping, δ Psc, 63 Piscium, BD+06°107, FK5 28, HD 4656, HIP 3786, HR 224, SAO 109474, WDS J00487+0735A

Database references
SIMBAD	data

Delta Piscium, also named Waiping, is a solitary, orange-hued star in the zodiac constellation of Pisces. It has an apparent visual magnitude of +4.4, so it is bright enough to be faintly visible to the naked eye. Based upon an annual parallax shift of 10.86 mas, it is around 300 light-years (92 parsecs) from the Sun. The visual magnitude of the star is diminished by an interstellar absorption factor of 0.08 due to interstellar dust.

== Naming ==
Delta Piscium (Latinized from δ Piscium) is the star's Bayer designation.

In Chinese astronomy, 外屏 (Wài Píng), meaning Outer Fence, refers to an asterism of stars, δ Piscium, ε Piscium, ζ Piscium, μ Piscium, ν Piscium, ξ Piscium and α Piscium. Consequently, the Chinese name for δ Piscium itself is 外屏一 (Wài Píng yī, English: the First Star of Outer Fence.) The IAU Working Group on Star Names approved the name Waiping for this star on 17 September 2026.

== Properties ==
This is an evolved K-type giant star with a stellar classification of K4 IIIb. It has around 1.65 times the mass of the Sun and, at the age of three billion years, has expanded to 38 times the Sun's radius. The star is radiating 292 times the Sun's luminosity from its enlarged photosphere at an effective temperature of 3,868 K.

Because Delta Piscium is positioned near the ecliptic, so it is subject to lunar occultations. It has a magnitude 13.99 visual companion at an angular separation of 135.0 arc seconds on a position angle of 12°, as of 2011.
