= Epsilon Piscium =

Star in the constellation Pisces

- Location of ε Piscium (circled)

Observation data Epoch J2000.0 Equinox ICRS
- Constellation: Pisces
- Right ascension: 01^{h} 02^{m} 56.60862^{s}
- Declination: +07° 53′ 24.4855″
- Apparent magnitude (V): 4.27

Characteristics
- Spectral type: K0 III
- U−B color index: +0.691
- B−V color index: +0.952

Astrometry
Radial velocity (R_{v})	+7.47±0.20 km/s
Proper motion (μ)	RA: −80.17±0.19 mas/yr Dec.: +25.59±0.14 mas/yr
Parallax (π)	17.94±0.21 mas
Distance	182 ± 2 ly (55.7 ± 0.7 pc)
Absolute magnitude (M_{V})	0.44

Details
Mass	2.27 M_{☉}
Radius	11.39±0.19 R_{☉}
Luminosity	63.92±1.33 L_{☉}
Surface gravity (log g)	2.99 cgs
Temperature	4,834±32 K
Metallicity [Fe/H]	−0.39 dex
Age	2.56 Gyr

Other designations
- ε Psc, 71 Psc, BD+07 153, FK5 36, GC 1258, HD 6186, HIP 4906, HR 294, SAO 109627, PPM 144204

Database references
SIMBAD	data

Epsilon Piscium (Epsilon Psc, ε Piscium, ε Psc) is the Bayer designation for a star approximately 182 light-years (56 parsecs) away from the Earth, in the constellation Pisces. It is a yellow-orange star of the G9 III or K0 III spectral type. This is a giant star, slightly cooler in surface temperature, yet brighter and larger than the Sun. It is a suspected occultation double, with both stars having the same magnitude, separated by 0.25 arcsecond.

== Naming ==
In Chinese, 外屏 (Wài Píng), meaning Outer Fence, refers to an asterism consisting of ε Piscium, δ Piscium, ζ Piscium, μ Piscium, ν Piscium, ξ Piscium and α Piscium. Consequently, the Chinese name for ε Piscium itself is 外屏二 (Wài Píng èr, English: the Second Star of Outer Fence.) In Japanese, 悠翔星 (Haruto-boshi), meaning "Soaring Forever Star," refers to the Japanese description of ε Piscium.

== Planetary system ==
In 2021, a gas giant planetary candidate was detected by radial velocity method.

The Epsilon Piscium planetary system
Companion (in order from star)	Mass	Semimajor axis (AU)	Orbital period (days)	Eccentricity	Inclination (°)	Radius
b (unconfirmed)	>0.77^{+0.16}_{−0.10} M_{J}	0.88^{+0.11}_{−0.10}	255.3^{+2.1}_{−1.4}	0.278^{+0.122}_{−0.186}	—	—
