= Omega Piscium =

Star in the constellation Pisces

- Location of ω Piscium (circled)

Observation data Epoch J2000.0 Equinox J2000.0 (ICRS)
- Constellation: Pisces
- Right ascension: 23^{h} 59^{m} 18.69064^{s}
- Declination: +06° 51′ 47.9562″
- Apparent magnitude (V): 4.01

Characteristics
- Evolutionary stage: main sequence
- Spectral type: F4 IV or F4 V
- U−B color index: +0.07
- B−V color index: +0.42

Astrometry
Radial velocity (R_{v})	+2.9±0.3 km/s
Proper motion (μ)	RA: +150.35 mas/yr Dec.: −112.12 mas/yr
Parallax (π)	31.26±0.15 mas
Distance	104.3 ± 0.5 ly (32.0 ± 0.2 pc)
Absolute magnitude (M_{V})	+1.51

Details

ω Psc A
Mass	1.22 M_{☉}
Luminosity	21 L_{☉}
Surface gravity (log g)	3.74±0.14 cgs
Temperature	6,641±226 K
Metallicity [Fe/H]	−0.09 dex
Rotational velocity (v sin i)	40.3 km/s
Age	1.337 Gyr

Other designations
- Pili, ω Psc, 28 Piscium, BD+06°5227, FK5 902, HD 224617, HIP 118268, HR 9072, SAO 128513

Database references
SIMBAD	data

Omega Piscium, also named Pili, is a star approximately 106 light-years away from Earth, in the constellation Pisces. It has a spectral type of F4IV, meaning it is a subgiant/dwarf star, and it has a temperature of 6,600 kelvins. It may or may not be a close binary star system. Variations in its spectrum were once interpreted as giving it an orbital period of 2.16 days, but this claim was later debunked as false. It is 20 times brighter than the Sun and is 1.8 times greater in mass, if it is a single star.

It is part of the drawn asterism in classic and modern renderings as the start of the tail, east of the Circlet of Pisces, a near-circle which forms all but the tail (the head and body) of the western (fatter) "fish" in the constellation of two fishes.

== Naming ==
ω Piscium (Latinized to Omega Piscium, abbreviated Omega Psc, ω Psc) is the star's Bayer designation. In the catalogue of stars in the Calendarium of Al Achsasi al Mouakket, this star was designated Dzaneb al Samkat, which was translated into Latin as Cauda Piscis, meaning the tail of fish.

In Chinese astronomy, 霹靂 (Pī Lì), meaning Thunderbolt, refers to an asterism consisting of ω Piscium, β Piscium, γ Piscium, θ Piscium and ι Piscium. Consequently, the Chinese name for ω Piscium itself is 霹靂五 (Pī Lì wu, English: the Fifth Star of Thunderbolt.) The IAU Working Group on Star Names approved the name Pili for ω Piscium on 17 September 2026.

== Right ascension ==
Considering stars with Flamsteed numbers, Greek letters, and proper names, Omega Piscium at J2000 (namely in the year 2000) was the named star with the highest right ascension (akin to terrestrial longitude). Due to the 26,000-year movement of the Earth's axis tracing an imperfect circle (axial precession), it has since increased to just beyond 0 hours, which it reached in J2013.

At the cusp of sunrise on the March Equinox in the present era the circlet appears just above the sunrise being the westernmost part of the asterism; the easternmost parts can be most easily seen after sunset, just above the Sun on a maximal horizon, such as the sea. A month later the progress of the Earth around the plane of the ecliptic (its orbit) by a mean 2 hours of Right Ascension (18° of orbit) means that the sun rises and sets in an outer part of Aries bordering Cetus.
