= Rho Piscium =

Star in the constellation Pisces

- Location of ρ Piscium (circled)

Observation data Epoch J2000.0 Equinox J2000.0 (ICRS)
- Constellation: Pisces
- Right ascension: 01^{h} 26^{m} 15.26240^{s}
- Declination: +19° 10′ 20.4506″
- Apparent magnitude (V): +5.344

Characteristics
- Evolutionary stage: main sequence
- Spectral type: F2 V
- B−V color index: +0.374

Astrometry
Radial velocity (R_{v})	−7.7±1.0 km/s
Proper motion (μ)	RA: −25.803 mas/yr Dec.: +11.283 mas/yr
Parallax (π)	38.8391±0.0834 mas
Distance	84.0 ± 0.2 ly (25.75 ± 0.06 pc)
Absolute magnitude (M_{V})	+3.34

Details
Mass	1.31 M_{☉}
Radius	1.1 R_{☉}
Luminosity	3.6 L_{☉}
Surface gravity (log g)	4.41±0.14 cgs
Temperature	6,822±232 K
Metallicity [Fe/H]	−0.31 dex
Rotational velocity (v sin i)	60.1 km/s
Age	778 Myr

Other designations
- ρ Psc, 93 Piscium, BD+18°187, HD 8723, HIP 6706, HR 413, SAO 92436

Database references
SIMBAD	data

Rho Piscium (ρ Piscium) is a solitary, yellow-hued star in the zodiac constellation of Pisces. With an apparent visual magnitude of +5.34, it is faintly visible to the naked eye. Based upon an annual parallax shift of 38.84 mas as seen from Earth, it is located 84 light years from the Sun. It is a member of the thin disk population of the Milky Way.

This is an F-type main sequence star with a stellar classification of F2 V. It is a suspected variable star that ranges in magnitude from a maximum of 5.35 to a minimum of 5.44 magnitude. The star is a source of X-ray emission with a luminosity of 117.6×10^{20} W. It is 778 million years old and is spinning with a projected rotational velocity of 60.1 km/s. The star has 1.3 times the mass of the Sun and about 1.1 times the Sun's radius. It is radiating 3.6 times the Sun's luminosity from its photosphere at an effective temperature of 6,822 K.

== Naming ==
In Chinese, 右更 (Yòu Gèng), meaning Official in Charge of the Pasturing, refers to an asterism consisting of ρ Piscium, η Piscium, π Piscium, ο Piscium and 104 Piscium. Consequently, the Chinese name for ρ Piscium itself is 右更一 (Yòu Gèng yī, English: the First Star of Official in Charge of the Pasturing.)
