= Zeta Piscium =

Star system in the constellation Pisces

- Location of ζ Piscium (circled)

Observation data Epoch J2000.0 Equinox ICRS
- Constellation: Pisces
- ζ Psc A
- Right ascension: 01^{h} 13^{m} 45.17477^{s}
- Declination: +07° 34′ 31.2745″
- Apparent magnitude (V): 5.28
- ζ Psc B
- Right ascension: 01^{h} 13^{m} 43.88735^{s}
- Declination: +07° 34′ 42.1765″
- Apparent magnitude (V): 6.43

Characteristics
- Spectral type: A7IV + A7IV + F7V + G7V + ?

Astrometry

ζ Psc A
Proper motion (μ)	RA: +145.00 mas/yr Dec.: −55.69 mas/yr
Parallax (π)	18.76±2.76 mas
Distance	approx. 170 ly (approx. 53 pc)
Absolute magnitude (M_{V})	1.97

ζ Psc B
Proper motion (μ)	RA: +181.78 mas/yr Dec.: −40.34 mas/yr

Details

ζ Psc A
Mass	2.07±0.13 M_{☉}
Luminosity	27.4 L_{☉}
Temperature	7,345 K
Rotational velocity (v sin i)	196 km/s

ζ Psc B
Metallicity [Fe/H]	0.18 dex

Other designations
- ζ Psc, 86 Piscium, WDS J01137+0735
- ζ Psc A: Revati, BD+06°174, FK5 1033, HD 7344, HIP 5737, HR 361, SAO 109739
- ζ Psc B: Paushna, BD+06°175, HD 7345, HIP 5743, HR 362, SAO 109740

Database references
SIMBAD	The system
- A
- B

Zeta Piscium is a quintuple star system in the zodiac constellation of Pisces. The two main components have the proper names Revati (/ˈreɪvəti/) and Paushna, both traditional names for the system. Based upon parallax measurements obtained during the Hipparcos mission, it is located roughly 170 light-years (52 parsecs) distant from the Sun.

The system consists of a binary star (Zeta Piscium A) and a triple star system (BC), the latter consisting of a spectroscopic binary (B) and a single star (C). A's two components are themselves designated Zeta Piscium Aa (Revati) and Ab; B's two components as Ba (Paushna) and Bb.

As the star system is 0.21° south of the ecliptic, it can be eclipsed (occulted) by the moon, when close to or at one of its two nodes of its orbit; and is eclipsed by the sun from about 8-10 April.

== Nomenclature ==
ζ Piscium (Latinised to Zeta Piscium, abbreviated Zet Psc, ζ Psc) is the system's Bayer designation. The designations of the three constituents as Zeta Piscium A, B and C, and those of A's and B's components - Zeta Piscium Aa, Ab, Ba and Bb - derive from the convention used by the Washington Multiplicity Catalog (WMC) for multiple star systems, and adopted by the International Astronomical Union (IAU).

The system is identified with Revati (Sanskrit: रेवती, romanized: rēvatī, Sanskrit pronunciation: [ˈreːʋɐt̪iː]), one of the Indian nakshatras (lunar mansions). In 2016, the IAU organized a Working Group on Star Names (WGSN) to catalog and standardize proper names for stars. The WGSN decided to attribute proper names to individual stars rather than entire multiple systems. It approved the name Revati for the constituent Zeta Piscium A on 30 June 2017 and it is now so included in the List of IAU-approved Star Names. Where a component letter is not explicitly listed, the WGSN says that the name should be understood to be attributed to the brightest component by visual brightness (component Aa in this case). Another name for Revati is Paushna (Sanskrit: पौष्ण, romanized: pauṣṇa); the WGSN adopted the name Paushna for Zeta Piscium B (implicitly, component Ba) on 17 September 2026.

In Chinese astronomy, Chinese: 外屏; pinyin: Wài Píng; lit. 'Outer Fence', refers to an asterism consisting of Zeta Piscium, Delta Piscium, Epsilon Piscium, Mu Piscium, Nu Piscium, Xi Piscium and Alpha Piscium. Consequently, the Chinese name for Zeta Piscium itself is Chinese: 外屏三; pinyin: Wài Píng sān; lit. 'the Third Star of Outer Fence'

== Properties ==
The primary, Zeta Piscium A, is a pair of A-type subgiant stars with an angular separation of 0.15 arcseconds and visual magnitude 5.28.

The secondary, Zeta Piscium B, is a spectroscopic binary with a period of 9.075 days and an eccentricity of 0.04. Together, components Ba and Bb have a combined visual magnitude of 6.43 and lie at an angular separation of 22.9 arcseconds from the primary. They are a F-type main sequence star and a G-type main sequence star, respectively.

The tertiary and fifth component, Zeta Piscium C, is a magnitude 12.2 star at an angular separation 1.0 arc seconds from component B.

Together the star system has an apparent magnitude of +4.9.

== See also ==
- Revati (nakshatra)
