= Revathi Pattathanam =

Revathi Pattathanam is an annual assembly of scholars held since ancient times at Kozhikode in Kerala, India. Traditionally a seven-day event, the festival used to be held under the patronage of the Zamorin of Kozhikode. The prime event of the assembly is the conferring of the title Bhatta along with a Panakizhi (purse of money) to selected scholars. The word Pattathanam is derived from Bhattadānam, which in Malayalam means "awarding of the Bhatta". The assembly used to begin on the day of the Revathi asterism, and hence the title Revathi Pattathanam.

The Calicut Grandhavari (Calicut Chronicles) states that the Zamorin Raja when he was the Naduvazhi (chieftain) of Ernad earlier, confiscated the Tali Siva temple and forcefully removed sixty Saivite Brahmin trustees. Some of the trustees who resisted were executed. Tradition has it that Revathi Pattathanam, a competition for scholars, came to be organized in the 14th century as a Prayaschitta for this Brahmanahatya (murder of Brahmins, described as one of the five great sins in Dharmashastras). Following the take over of the temple, the royal family came to the verge of extinction due to the absence of progeny. This was interpreted as the consequence of the Brahmin curse. To remove this curse, the Saiva saint Kolkunnattu Savankal, a contemporary of poet Raghavananda towards the end of the thirteenth century, advised the Zamorin to institute the competition on the latter's birth asterism of Revati every year. The competition was conducted annually and gifts were distributed for winners in four fields of knowledge- Tarka, Vyakarana, Mimamsa and Vedanta. More subjects were added at later stages.

The competition was a major event in south India during the medieval period. Great scholars like the famous Uddanda Shastri from Tamil Nadu, author of the Kokila Sandeśa and Mallika Maruta, was a prominent participant in the contest for the Bhattasthana (the seat of a Bhatta). He was ultimately defeated by Kakkashery Bhattripad. This incident is described in the Malayalam classic aithihya kathakal or Aithihyamala

The competition was conducted for seven days beginning from the asterism of Revathi in the month of Tulam on two mandapas (platforms) on either side of the Vatilmadam (entrance hall) of Tali temple. The competition was conducted under the watchful eyes of judges who were chosen from recipients of the Sthanam in previous years, known as the 'Old Sabha'. The Raja himself was seated at the southern end of the long hall on the southern side. Bhatta Mimamsa, Prabhakara Mimamsa, Vyakarana and Vedanta were represented by lighted lamps on different parts of the platform. The debates were serious and were conducted with a high degree of merit and erudition. It is noted in this regard that even the candidature of a great scholar like Melpathur Narayana Bhattathiri, the author of Narayaneeyam and Prakriya Sarvasvam was rejected by the Old Sabha six times.

The Pattathanam starts with an invitation sent to the two important yogas of Brahmin scholars in Kerala belonging to Cheviyannur and Kotamangalam respectively. On the last day, Mangat Achan announces the list of winners prepared by the judges. The Raja would prostrate before the winners to seek their blessing and distributed kizhis (purses) containing one hundred and one Panam each to one hundred Smartas (one who is proficient in the Smritis).

== See also ==
- History of Kerala
- Saamoothiri
