= Pi Piscium =

Binary star in the constellation Pisces

- Location of π Piscium (circled)

Observation data Epoch J2000.0 Equinox J2000.0 (ICRS)
- Constellation: Pisces
- Right ascension: 01^{h} 37^{m} 05.91523^{s}
- Declination: +12° 08′ 29.5186″
- Apparent magnitude (V): 5.60 (5.56 + 9.56)

Characteristics
- Spectral type: F0 V + KV

Astrometry
Radial velocity (R_{v})	−1.0 km/s
Proper motion (μ)	RA: −77.29 mas/yr Dec.: +9.13 mas/yr
Parallax (π)	28.50±0.97 mas
Distance	114 ± 4 ly (35 ± 1 pc)
Absolute magnitude (M_{V})	+2.94

Details

A
Mass	1.42 M_{☉}
Radius	1.68 (Note: Calculated, using the Stefan-Boltzmann law and the star's effective temperature and luminosity, with respect to the solar nominal effective temperature of 5,772 K: $$\sqrt{\biggl(\frac{5,772}{6,810}\biggr)^4 \cdot 5.45} = 1.68\ R_\odot.$$ $$\sqrt{\biggl(\frac{5,772}{4,700}\biggr)^4 \cdot 0.207} = 0.69\ R_\odot.$$) R_{☉}
Luminosity	5.45 (Note: Calculated from the equation L = 10^{0.4 • (4.74 − M_{bol}}, where M_{bol} is the absolute bolometric magnitude. For component A, a value of 2.90 is used, while for B a value of 6.45 is used.) L_{☉}
Surface gravity (log g)	4.16 cgs
Temperature	6,810 K
Metallicity [Fe/H]	−0.10 dex
Rotational velocity (v sin i)	105.9 km/s
Age	2.0 Gyr

B
Mass	0.75 M_{☉}
Radius	0.69 R_{☉}
Luminosity	0.207 L_{☉}
Temperature	4,700 K

Other designations
- Idigna, π Psc, 102 Piscium, BD+11°205, FK5 1046, GC 1954, HD 9919, HIP 7535, HR 463, SAO 92536, PPM 117498

Database references
SIMBAD	data

Pi Piscium, also named Idigna, is a spectroscopic binary star in the zodiac constellation of Pisces. It is faintly visible to the naked eye, having an apparent visual magnitude of 5.60. Based upon an annual parallax shift of 28.50 mas as seen from Earth, it is 114 light years distant. It is a member of the thin disk population of the Milky Way.

== Naming ==
Pi Piscium (Latinized from π Piscium, abbreviated Pi Psc, π Psc) is the star's Bayer designation. In Chinese astronomy, 右更 (Yòu Gèng), meaning Official in Charge of the Pasturing, refers to an asterism consisting of π Piscium, η Piscium, ρ Piscium, ο Piscium and 104 Piscium. Consequently, the Chinese name for π Piscium itself is 右更三 (Yòu Gèng sān, English: the Third Star of Official in Charge of the Pasturing.)

This star system was part of the Sumerian constellation IDIGNA, representing the river Tigris. In ancient Mesopotamia, Pisces was visualized both as a swallow (SIM.MAḪ) and as the Tigris and Euphrates rivers. The IAU Working Group on Star Names adopted the name Idigna for Pi Piscium A on 17 September 2026. (Note: The name Idigna was originally adopted for the fainter variable star HD 10783 (UZ Piscium), but changed to π Piscium shortly afterward.)

== Properties ==
The primary, of apparent magnitude 5.56, is an ordinary F-type main-sequence star with a stellar classification of F0 V. At the estimated age of two billion years, it is about 55% of the way through its main sequence lifetime and still has a relatively high rate of spin with a projected rotational velocity of 105.9 km/s. The star has 1.42 times the mass of the Sun and 1.68 of the Sun's radius. It is radiating 5.5 times the Sun's luminosity at an effective temperature of 6,810 K. At that temperature, Pi Piscium A has a yellow-white hue, as many F-type stars.

The secondary, of apparent magnitude 9.56, is a K-dwarf star. It is 0.75 times as massive than the Sun, 0.69 times as large, and has 21% of the luminosity. Its effective temperature is 4,700 K, giving it an orange hue typical of K-type stars.

Analysis of its motion suggests Pi Piscium may be a member of the Ursa Major association, but higher-quality observations are needed to confirm this.
