= Revati (nakshatra) =

27th lunar mansion in Hindu astronomy

Pisces map showing Revati

Revati (Devanagari: रेवती), meaning "prosperous", is the 27th nakshatra (lunar mansion) in Indian astronomy and astrology, named after the goddess Revati. Its main star (yogatara) is ζ Piscium, a star in the zodiac constellation Pisces. This star has the modern name Revati after the nakshatra. In Hindu sidereal astronomy this star is identified as the March Equinox (confusingly with historic reasons, most often referred to as the First Point of Aries), i.e. when the Sun crosses this star, a new solar year begins.

Some vedic texts consider it as the birth nakshatra of Goddess Lakshmi, who is the bestower of wealth and prosperity. While the previous nakshatra, Uttara Bhadrapada, is also considered as the birth nakshatra of Lakshmi in several vedic texts, both nakshatras are often referred to as Lakshmi nakshatras.

== Astrology ==
It is ruled by Puṣan, one of the 12 Ādityas. According to the beliefs of traditional electional astrology, Revati is a sweet or delicate nakshatra, meaning that while Revati has the most influence, it is best to begin working on things of physical beauty like music and jewellery.

Revati is symbolized by fish (often a pair of fish). It is also associated with the sea.

Traditional Hindu given names are determined by which pada (quarter) of a nakshatra the Moon was in, at the time of birth. In the case of Revati, the given name would begin with the following syllables:

- De (दे)
- Do (दो)
- Cha (च)
- Chi (ची)
