= Alpha Piscium =

Binary star system in the constellation Pisces

α Piscium
- Location of α Piscium (circled)

Observation data Epoch J2000.0 Equinox J2000.0 (ICRS)
- Constellation: Pisces
- Right ascension: 02^{h} 02^{m} 02.81972^{s}
- Declination: +02° 45′ 49.5410″
- Apparent magnitude (V): 3.82 (4.33 + 5.23)

Characteristics
- Evolutionary stage: main sequence
- Spectral type: kA0hA7 Sr + kA2hF2mF2 (IV)
- Variable type: α^{2} CVn

Astrometry
| Proper motion (μ) | RA: +32.45 mas/yr Dec.: +0.04 mas/yr |
| Parallax (π) | 20.76±0.15 mas |
| Distance | 157.1 ± 1.1 ly (48.17±0.34 pc) |
| Absolute magnitude (M_{V}) | +0.50 |

Orbit
| Primary | α Psc A |
| Name | α Psc B |
| Period (P) | 2,822±215 yr |
| Semi-major axis (a) | 7.45±0.35" (359 AU (Note: Semi-major axis in AU = $\frac{semimajor\ axis\ in\ seconds}{parallax\ in\ seconds}\ {{=}}\ \frac{7.45}{.02076}$ = 359 AU; as the eccentricity is 0.465, the distance fluctuates between 53.5% and 146.5% of that, roughly from 192 AU to 526 AU.)) |
| Eccentricity (e) | 0.4650±0.0145 |
| Inclination (i) | 113.01±2.45° |
| Longitude of the node (Ω) | 3.09±6.28° |
| Periastron epoch (T) | 2188.6 |
| Argument of periastron (ω) (secondary) | 150±6° |

Orbit
| Primary | α Psc Ba |
| Name | α Psc Bb |
| Period (P) | 24.999428±0.000033 days |
| Semi-major axis (a) | (5.175±0.018)×10^{−3}" (0.2493±0.0020 AU) |
| Eccentricity (e) | 0.6004±0.0018 |
| Inclination (i) | 65.2±0.4° |
| Longitude of the node (Ω) | 73.08±0.63° |
| Argument of periastron (ω) (primary) | 140.14±0.42° |
| Semi-amplitude (K_{1}) (primary) | 61.17±0.35 km/s |
| Semi-amplitude (K_{2}) (secondary) | 61.97±0.47 km/s |

Details

α Psc A
| Mass | 2.49±0.05 M_{☉} |
| Radius | 2.33±0.26 R_{☉} |
| Luminosity | 53.7+8.0 −6.9 L_{☉} |
| Surface gravity (log g) | 4.01±0.14 cgs |
| Temperature | 10,000±710 K |
| Rotation | 1.491±0.022 days |
| Rotational velocity (v sin i) | 81 km/s |
| Age | 330±150 Myr |

α Psc Ba
| Mass | 1.668±0.033 M_{☉} |
| Radius | 1.76±0.41 R_{☉} |
| Surface gravity (log g) | 4.0 cgs |
| Temperature | 8,000 K |

α Psc Bb
| Mass | 1.646±0.029 M_{☉} |
| Radius | 1.55±0.41 R_{☉} |
| Surface gravity (log g) | 4.0 cgs |
| Temperature | 8,000 K |

Other designations
- Alrischa, Kaitain, Okda, Okdah, Syndesmos, α Psc, 113 Piscium, BD+02°317, FK5 28, HIP 9487, SAO 110291, WDS J02020+0246AB
- α Psc A: HD 12447, HR 596
- α Psc B: HD 12446, HR 595

Database references
| SIMBAD | α Psc |
- α Psc A
- α Psc B

Alpha Piscium (α Piscium) is a triple star system in the equatorial constellation of Pisces. Based upon dynamical parallax measurements, it is about 157 light-years from the Solar System.

The three components are designated Alpha Piscium A (officially named Alrescha /ælˈriːʃə/, the traditional name of the system), Ba and Bb.

== Nomenclature ==
α Piscium (Latinised to Alpha Piscium) is the star's Bayer designation. The designations of the two components as Alpha Piscium A and B derive from the convention used by the Washington Multiplicity Catalog (WMC) for multiple star systems, and adopted by the International Astronomical Union (IAU).

The system bore the traditional name Alrescha (alternatively Al Rescha, Alrischa, Alrisha) derived from the Arabic الرشآء ar-Rishā’ "the cord" and less commonly Kaitain and Okda, the latter from the Arabic عقدة ʽuqdah "knot" (see Ukdah). In 2016, the International Astronomical Union organized a Working Group on Star Names (WGSN) to catalog and standardize proper names for stars. The WGSN approved the name Alrescha for the component Alpha Piscium A on 21 August 2016 and it is now so included in the List of IAU-approved Star Names.

In Chinese, 外屏 (Wài Píng), meaning Outer Fence, refers to an asterism consisting of Alpha Piscium, Delta Piscium, Epsilon Piscium, Zeta Piscium, Mu Piscium, Nu Piscium and Xi Piscium. Consequently, the Chinese name for Alpha Piscium itself is 外屏七 (Wài Píng qī, English: the Seventh Star of Outer Fence).

== Properties ==
Alpha Piscium comprises an hierarchical architecture. The outer system comprises the star Alpha Piscium A and the subsystem Alpha Piscium B, separated by 1.85". Alpha Piscium A, the primary, is of magnitude +4.33 and spectral type kA0hA7 Sr, while the components of Alpha Piscium B have combined magnitude 5.23 and combined spectral class kA2hF2mF2 (IV). The two bodies take roughly 2,800 years to orbit one another and they will make their closest approach to each other around 2188. The components of Alpha Piscium B, called Ba and Bb, have an orbital period of roughly 25 days and a semi-major axis of 0.2493±0.0020 AU.

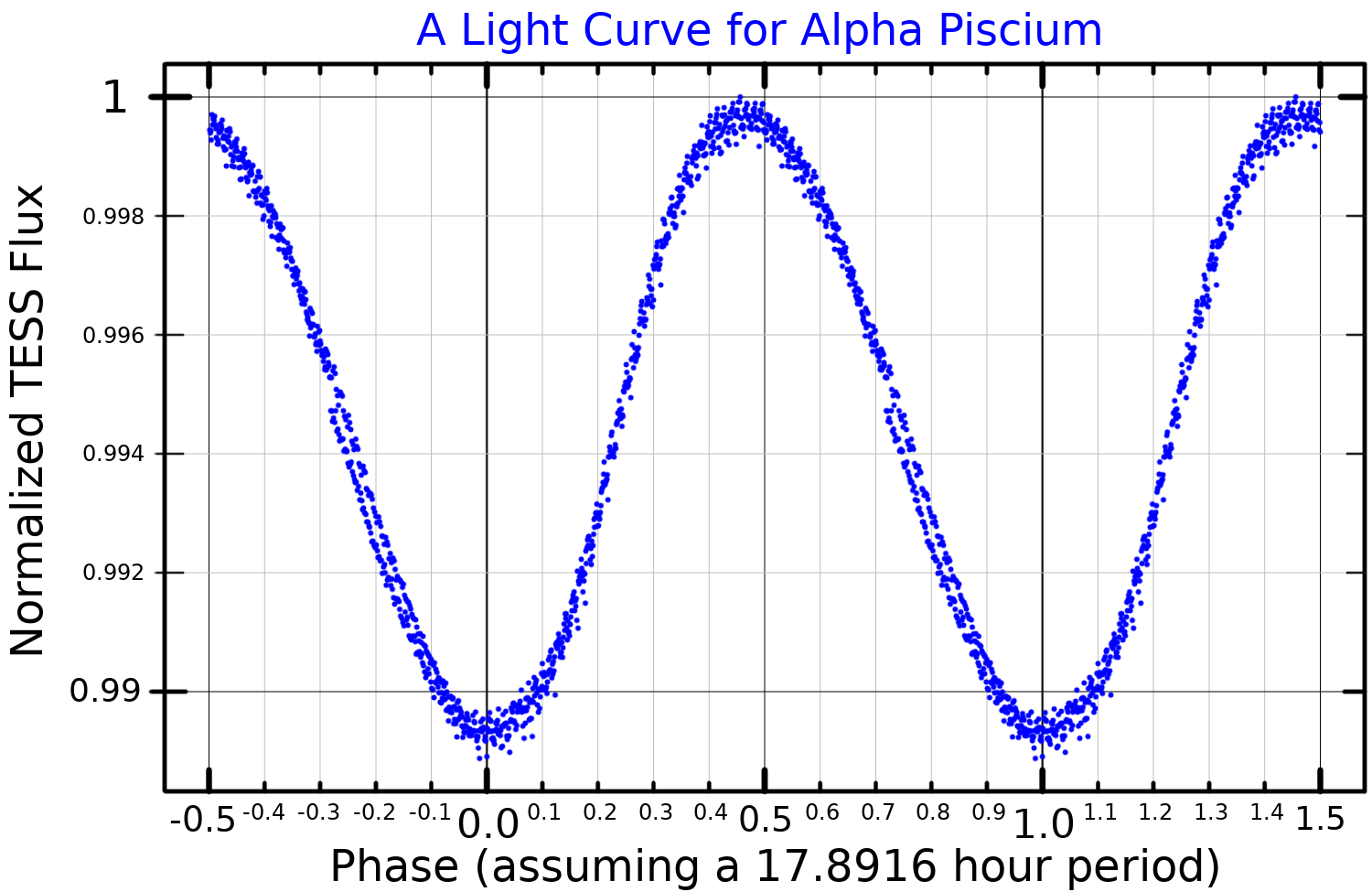
A light curve for Alpha Piscium, plotted from TESS data

Alpha Piscium is catalogued as an α^{2} Canum Venaticorum variable, a type of variable star where the brightness changes are caused by the rotation of the star. The brightness varies by about 1/100 of a magnitude, identified from Hipparcos photometry. The primary component is thought to be the source of the variations, and it has a period of 0.845 days which was believed to be the rotation period of the star, but the latter has been revised to 1.49 days. Variations with a period of 6.65 days have also been identified.

Alpha Piscium composes a four-star system together with the G1/2V star HIP 9519, which is separated by 404.7".

== Long-exposure observation ==
Stars that can set (not in a circumpolar constellation for the viewer) culminate at midnight – where viewed away from any polar region experiencing midnight sun – when at opposition, meaning they can be viewed from dusk until dawn. This applies to α Piscium on 21 October, in the current astronomical epoch.

Half of the year from this date, 22 April, the star will be at conjunction above or below, the sun – apart by the star's declination (angle set out in table, right). The nearby days and months have most of the star's risen time during daylight.
