= Eta Piscium =

Binary star system in the constellation Pisces

- Location of η Piscium (circled)

Observation data Epoch J2000 Equinox ICRS
- Constellation: Pisces
- Right ascension: 01^{h} 31^{m} 29.01026^{s}
- Declination: +15° 20′ 44.9685″
- Apparent magnitude (V): +3.611 (3.83 + 7.51)

Characteristics
- Spectral type: G7 IIIa
- U−B color index: +0.730
- B−V color index: +0.976
- Variable type: γ Cas

Astrometry
| Radial velocity (R_{v}) | 13.60±0.42 km/s |
| Proper motion (μ) | RA: +27.14 mas/yr Dec.: −2.64 mas/yr |
| Parallax (π) | 9.33±0.72 mas |
| Distance | 350 ± 30 ly (107 ± 8 pc) |
| Absolute magnitude (M_{V}) | −1.52 |

Orbit
| Period (P) | 850.5±66.5 yr |
| Semi-major axis (a) | 1.228±0.144″ |
| Eccentricity (e) | 0.469±0.053 |
| Inclination (i) | 58.5±2.5° |
| Longitude of the node (Ω) | 32.8±2.0° |
| Periastron epoch (T) | 2040.3±66.9 |
| Argument of periastron (ω) (secondary) | 86.9±4.0° |

Details

η Psc A
| Mass | 3.78±0.16 M_{☉} |
| Radius | 26.48±2.15 R_{☉} |
| Luminosity | 457 L_{☉} |
| Surface gravity (log g) | 2.20±0.14 cgs |
| Temperature | 4,937±40 K |
| Metallicity [Fe/H] | −0.13±0.06 dex |
| Rotational velocity (v sin i) | 8.4 km/s |
| Age | 220±30 Myr |

Other designations
- Alpherg, Kullat Nunu, η Psc, 99 Piscium, BD+14°231, FK5 50, HD 9270, HIP 7097, HR 437, SAO 92484, WDS J01315+1521AB

Database references
| SIMBAD | data |

Eta Piscium (η Piscium, abbreviated Eta Psc, η Psc) is a binary star and the brightest star in the equatorial-northern constellation of Pisces, with an apparent visual magnitude of +3.6. Based upon a measured annual parallax shift of 9.33 mas as seen from Earth, it is located roughly 350 light-years distant from the Sun in the thin disk population of the Milky Way.

The two components are designated Eta Piscium A (formally named Alpherg /ˈælfɜːrɡ/, a recent name of the system) and B.

== Nomenclature ==
η Piscium (Latinised to Eta Piscium) is the system's Bayer designation. The designations of the two constituents as Eta Piscium A and B derive from the convention used by the Washington Multiplicity Catalog (WMC) for multiple star systems, and adopted by the International Astronomical Union (IAU).

The system bore the names Al Pherg and Kullat Nunu. According to R. H. Allen's Star Names, the system was in the first ecliptic constellation of the Neo-Babylonians, Kullat Nūnu − Nūnu being Babylonian for fish and Kullat referring to the cord that binds the fish. Al Pherg is derived from the Arabic lunar station name al-fargh (الفرغ, 'the spout'), which originally referred to two pairs of stars forming the Great Square of Pegasus, but which some old texts associated with Pisces. It was used as a name for η Piscium in a 1923 book on astrology. In 2016, the IAU organized a Working Group on Star Names (WGSN) to catalog and standardize proper names for stars. The WGSN decided to attribute proper names to individual stars rather than entire multiple systems. It approved the name Alpherg for the component Eta Piscium A on 1 June 2018 (for its official List).

In Chinese, 右更 (Yòu Gēng), meaning Official in Charge of the Pasturing, refers to an asterism consisting of Eta Piscium, Rho Piscium, Pi Piscium, Omicron Piscium and 104 Piscium. Consequently, the Chinese name for Eta Piscium itself is 右更二 (Yòu Gēng èr, English: the Second Star of Official in Charge of the Pasturing.)

== Properties ==
At its present distance, the visual magnitude of the system is diminished by an extinction factor of 0.09±0.06 due to interstellar dust.

This system's binary nature was discovered in 1878 by an amateur astronomer, S. W. Burnham. It has an orbital period of roughly 850 years, a semimajor axis of 1.2 arc seconds, and an eccentricity of 0.47.

The primary, component A, is an evolved, magnitude 3.83 G-type giant star with a stellar classification of G7 IIIa. It has a weak magnetic field with a strength of 0.4±0.2 G, and is a Gamma Cassiopeiae variable. The companion, component B, is a magnitude 7.51 star.
