= Wall (Chinese constellation) =

Chinese constellation

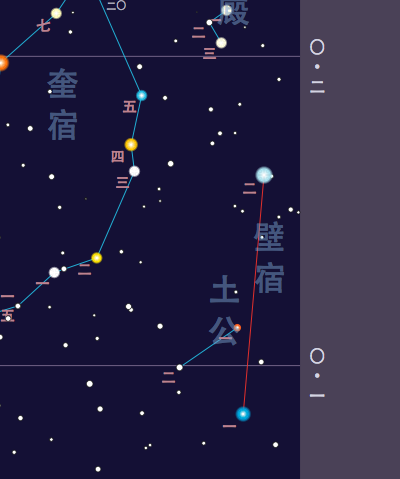
Bì Xiù map

The Wall mansion (Chinese: 壁宿; pinyin: Bì Xiù) is one of the Twenty-eight mansions of the Chinese constellations. It is one of the northern mansions of the Black Tortoise.

== Asterisms ==
| English name | Chinese name | European constellation | Number of stars | Representing |
|---|---|---|---|---|
| Wall | 壁 | Pegasus/Andromeda | 2 | Walls, the library |
| Thunderbolt | 霹靂 | Pisces | 5 | A thunderclap |
| Cloud and Rain | 雲雨 | Pisces | 4 | cloud and rain |
| Celestial Stable | 天廄 | Andromeda | 3 | Stable, or the people who manage stable |
| Sickle | 鈇鑕 | Cetus | 5 | The sickle for harvesting |
| Official for Earthworks and Buildings | 土公 | Pisces | 2 | Officials responsible for infrastructure and construction |
