= Legs (Chinese constellation) =

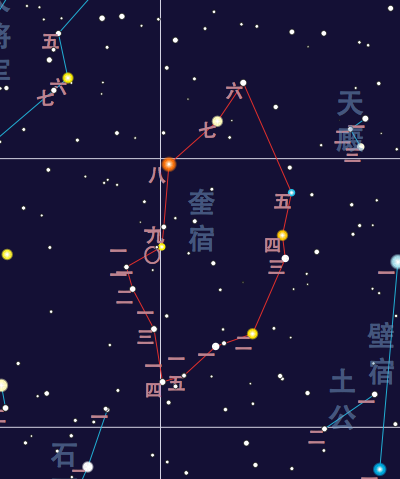
Kuí Xiù map

The Legs mansion (奎宿, pinyin: Kuí Xiù) is one of the Twenty-Eight Mansions of the Chinese constellations. It is one of the western mansions of the White Tiger.

The constellation Kui within the lunar mansion consists of 16 stars in the Western constellations Andromeda and Pisces. An older name of the constellation, dating back to the Neolithic, was Tianshi (天豕), the Celestial Pig, with Zeta Andromedae as the pig's eye. Zeta Andromedae was originally the determinative star of Kui, but this became Eta Andromedae during the Qing dynasty.

== Cultural significance ==
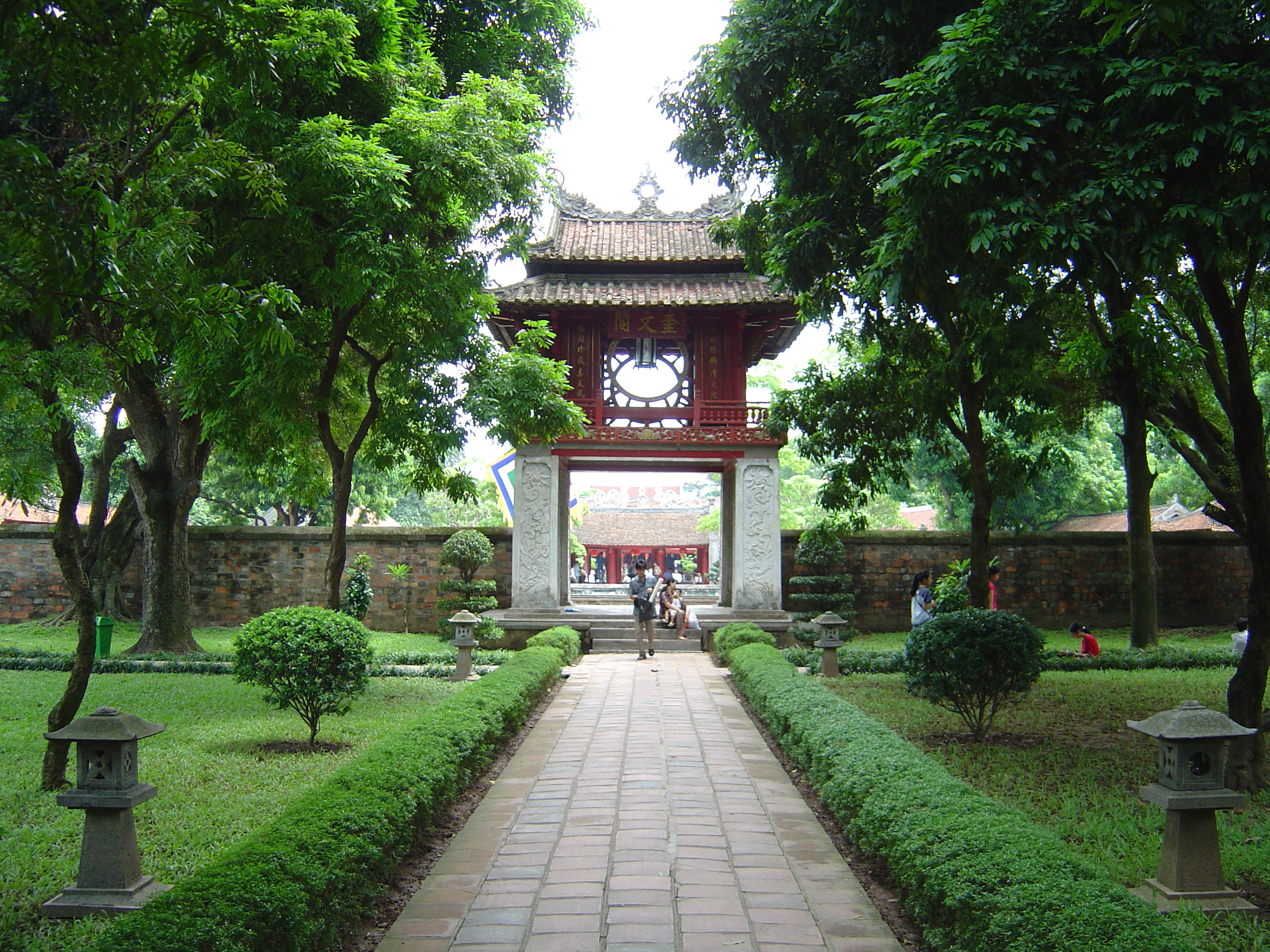
Khuê Văn Các (Pavilion of Kuí's Elegance), which is both the symbol of Hanoi and appears on the one-hundred-thousand Vietnamese dong note.

In East Asian cultures, the Legs mansion (Kuí Xiù) represents wisdom, scholarship and literature. A notable example is a structure known as "Kuiwen Pavilion" (奎文閣) in the many Confucius temples in China and other East Asian countries.

A jade sculpture of a pig from the Neolithic Lingjiatan culture is thought to represent the constellation Kui, as the Celestial Pig (Tianshi). It closely resembles the shape of the constellation, with its eye corresponding to Zeta Andromedae.

== Asterisms ==
| English name | Chinese name | European constellation | Number of stars | Representing |
|---|---|---|---|---|
| Legs | 奎 | Andromeda/Pisces | 16 | Possibly it is the rear legs or feet of the White Tiger. Alternatively, it was also seen as a wild boar. |
| Outer Fence | 外屏 | Pisces | 7 | A fence to screen off the cesspit of Celestial Pigsty (Tiānhùn) |
| Celestial Pigsty | 天溷 | Cetus | 4 | A manure pit on a farm in the pigsty |
| Master of Constructions | 土司空 | Cetus | 1 | A controller of land and minister of works |
| Southern Military Gate | 軍南門 | Andromeda | 1 | South gate of the barracks |
| Flying Corridor | 閣道 | Cassiopeia | 6 | A mountain path, it was also seen as the banner of Wangliang |
| Auxiliary Road | 附路 | Cassiopeia | 1 | The road pavement or alternate |
| Wang Liang | 王良 | Cassiopeia | 5 | Wang Liang was a famous charioteer during the Spring and Autumn period |
| Whip | 策 | Cassiopeia | 1 | The whip of Wang Liang |

== See also ==
- Kui Xing
