= Pisces (constellation) =

Zodiac constellation straddling the celestial equator

- Constellation
- List of stars in Pisces
- Abbreviation: Psc
- Genitive: Piscium
- Pronunciation: /ˈpaɪsiːz/; genitive /ˈpɪʃiəm/
- Symbolism: the Fishes
- Right ascension: 1^{h}
- Declination: +15°
- Quadrant: NQ1
- Area: 889 sq. deg. (14th)
- Main stars: 18
- Bayer/Flamsteed stars: 86
- Stars brighter than 3.00^{m}: 0
- Stars within 10.00 pc (32.62 ly): 8
- Brightest star: η Psc (Alpherg) (3.62^{m})
- Nearest star: Van Maanen's Star
- Messier objects: 1
- Meteor showers: Piscids
- Bordering constellations: Triangulum; Andromeda; Pegasus; Aquarius; Cetus; Aries
- Visible at latitudes between +84° and −57°. Best visible at 21:00 (9 p.m.) during the month of November.

Pisces is a constellation of the zodiac. Its vast bulk—and main asterism viewed in most European cultures per Greco-Roman antiquity as a distant pair of fishes connected by one cord each that join at an apex—are in the northern celestial hemisphere. Its traditional astrological symbol is (♓︎). Its name is Latin for "fishes". It is between Aquarius, of similar size, to the southwest and Aries, which is smaller, to the east. The ecliptic and the celestial equator intersect within this constellation, at the first point of Aries, and in Virgo, at the first point of Libra. The Sun passes directly overhead of the equator, on average, at approximately this point in the sky, at the March equinox.

The right ascension/declination 00 is located within the boundaries of Pisces.

== History and mythology ==
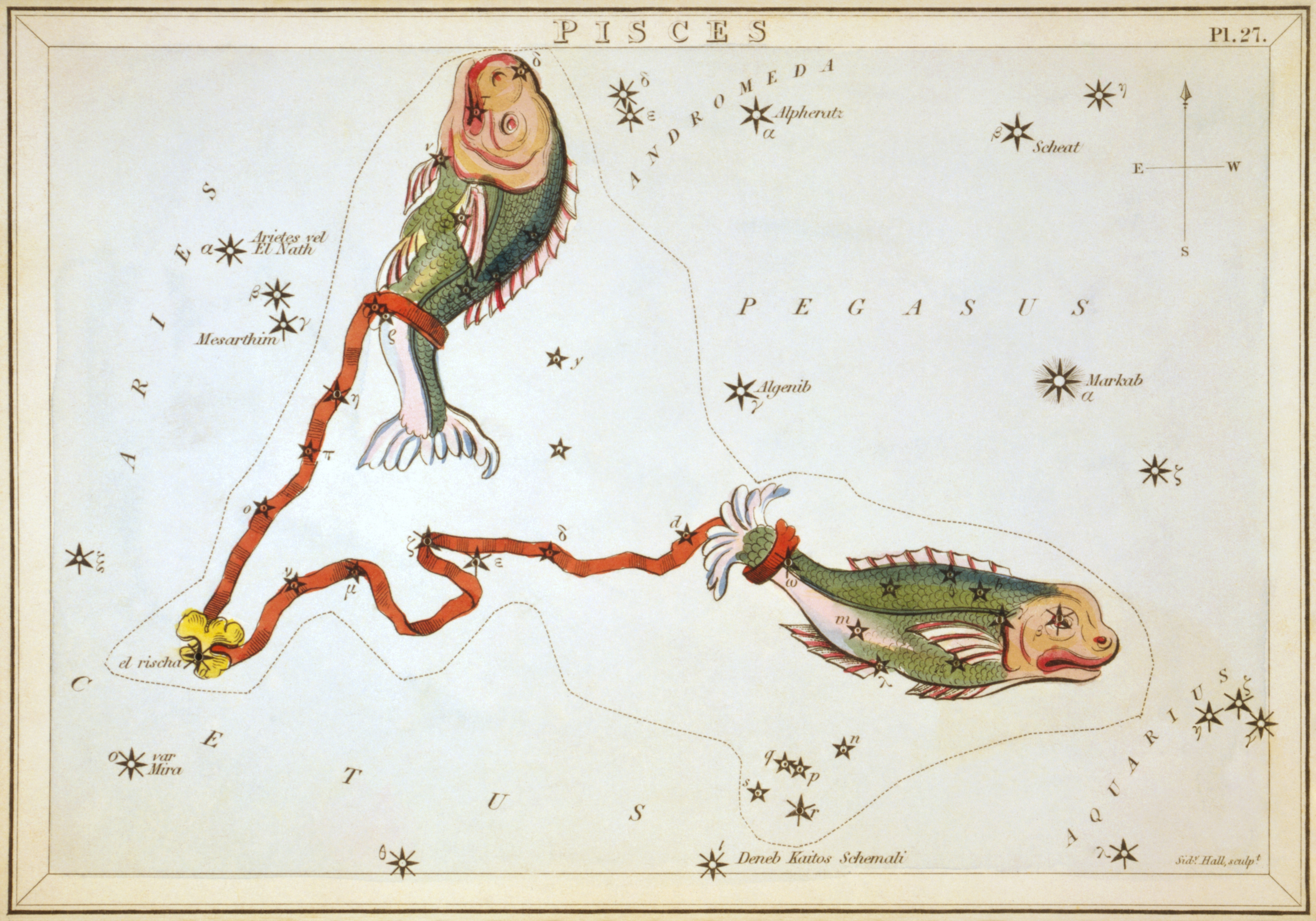
From Urania's Mirror (1824)

Pisces originates from some composition of the Babylonian constellations Šinunutu_{4} "the great swallow" in current western Pisces, and Anunitum the "Lady of the Heaven", at the place of the northern fish. In the first-millennium BC texts known as the Astronomical Diaries, part of the constellation was also called DU.NU.NU (Rikis-nu.mi, "the fish cord or ribbon").

=== Greco-Roman period ===
Pisces is associated with the Greek legend that Aphrodite and her son Eros either shape-shifted into forms of fishes to escape, or were rescued by two fishes.

In the Greek version according to Hyginus, Aphrodite and Eros while visiting Syria fled from the monster Typhon by leaping into the Euphrates River and transforming into fishes (Poeticon astronomicon 2.30, citing Diognetus Erythraeus). The Roman variant of the story has Venus and Cupid (counterparts for Aphrodite and Eros) carried away from this danger on the backs of two fishes (Ovid Fasti 2.457ff).

There is also a different origin tale that Hyginus preserved in another work. According to this, an egg rolled into the Euphrates, and some fishes nudged this to shore, after which the doves sat on the egg until Aphrodite (thereafter called the Syrian Goddess) hatched out of it. The fishes were then rewarded by being placed in the skies as a constellation (Fabulae 197). This story is also recorded by the Third Vatican Mythographer.

=== Modern period ===
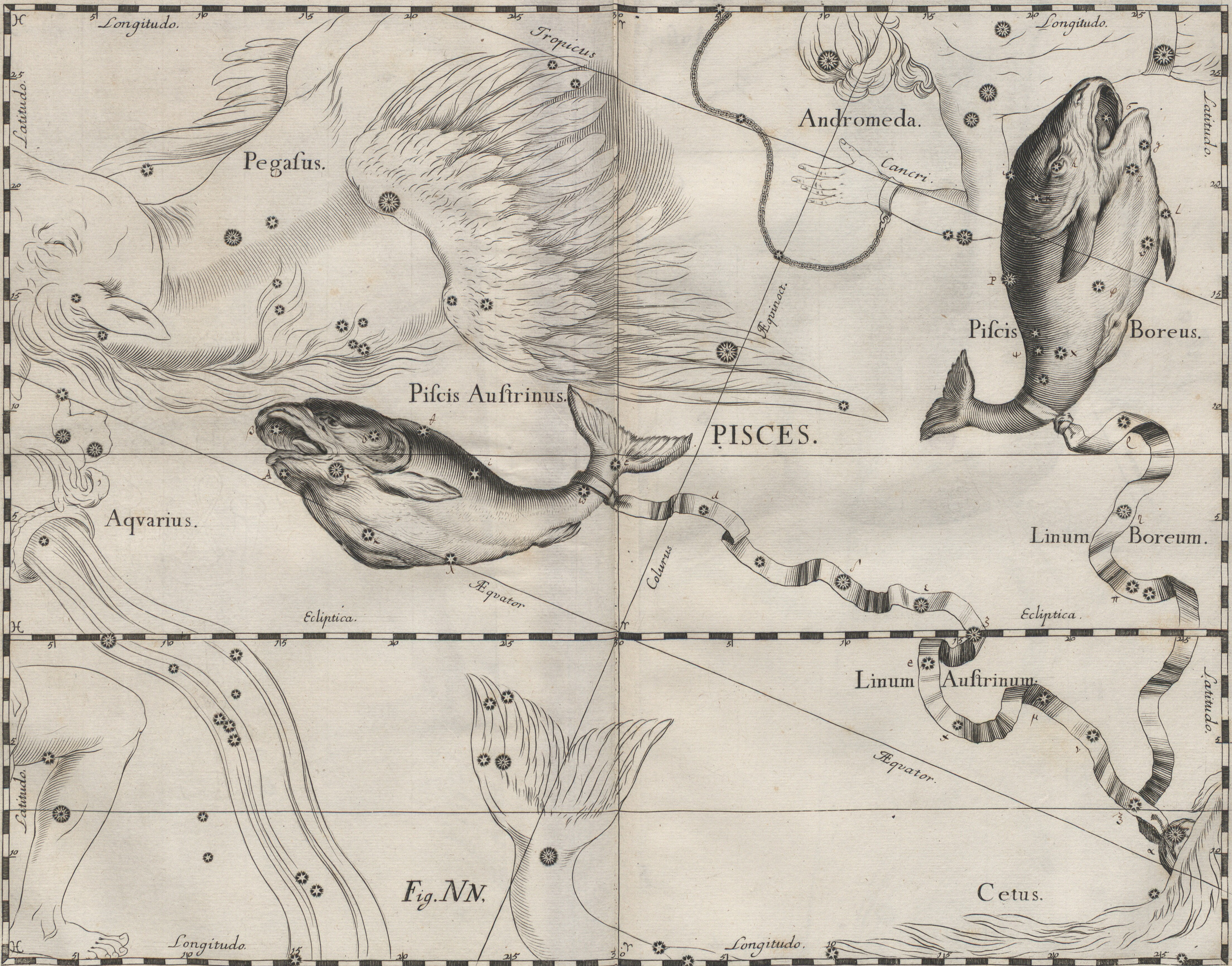
Pisces in Hevelius's map (1690); layout mirrored from the night sky

In 1690, the astronomer Johannes Hevelius in his Firmamentum Sobiescianum regarded the constellation Pisces as being composed of four subdivisions:

- Piscis Boreus (the North Fish): σ – 68 – 65 – 67 – ψ^{1} – ψ^{2} – ψ^{3} – χ – φ – υ – 91 – τ – 82 – 78 Psc.
- Linum Boreum (the North Cord): χ – ρ,94 – VX(97) – η – π – ο – α Psc.
- Linum Austrinum (the South Cord): α – ξ – ν – μ – ζ – ε – δ – 41 – 35 – ω Psc.
- Piscis Austrinus (the South Fish): ω – ι – θ – 7 – β – 5 – κ,9 – λ – TX(19) Psc.

"Piscis Austrinus" now refers to a separate constellation in its own right, which Hevelius and Bode called Piscis Notius.

In 1754, the botanist and author John Hill proposed to sever a southern zone of Pisces as Testudo (the Turtle). 24 – 27 – YY(30) – 33 – 29 Psc., It would host a natural but quite faint asterism in which the star 20 Psc is the head of the turtle. While Admiral Smyth mentioned the proposal, it was largely neglected by other astronomers, and it is now obsolete.

=== Western folklore ===
The Fishes are in the German lore of Antenteh, who owned just a tub and a crude cabin when he met two magical fish. They offered him a wish, which he refused. However, his wife begged him to return to the fish and ask for a beautifully furnished home. This wish was granted, but her desires were not satisfied. She then asked to be a queen and have a palace, but when she asked to become a goddess, the fish became angry and took the palace and home, leaving the couple with the tub and cabin once again. The tub is sometimes recognized as the Great Square of Pegasus.

=== In non-Western astronomy ===
The stars of Pisces were incorporated into several constellations in Chinese astronomy. Wai-ping ("Outer Enclosure") was a fence that kept a pig farmer from falling into the marshes and kept the pigs where they belonged. It was represented by Alpha, Delta, Epsilon, Zeta, Mu, Nu, and Xi Piscium. The marshes were represented by the four stars designated Phi Ceti. The northern fish of Pisces was a part of the House of the Sandal, Koui-siou.

== Features ==
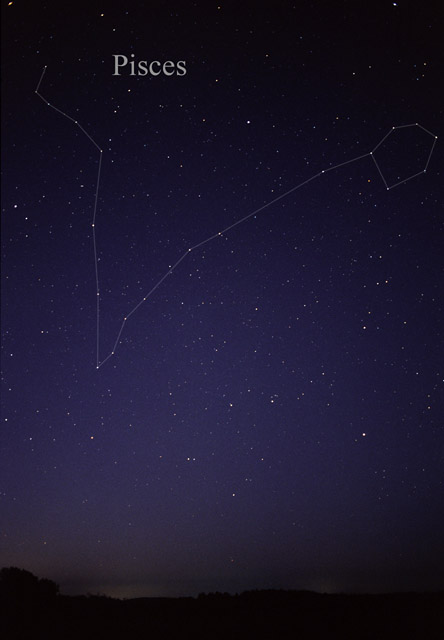
The constellation as it can be seen with the naked eye

The March equinox is currently situated in Pisces, directly south of ω Psc, and because of precession, it is gradually drifting westward, just below the western fish and moving toward Aquarius.

=== Stars ===
Although Pisces is a large constellation, there are only two stars brighter than magnitude 4 in Pisces. It is also the second dimmest of the zodiac constellations.

- Alrescha ("the cord"), otherwise Alpha Piscium (α Psc), 309.8 lightyears, class A2, magnitude 3.62, variable binary star
- Fumalsamakah ("mouth of the fish"), otherwise Beta Piscium (β Psc), 492 lightyears, class B6Ve, magnitude 4.48
- Delta Piscium (δ Psc), 305 lightyears, class K5III, magnitude 4.44. Like other stars near the ecliptic, Delta Piscium is subject to lunar occultations.
- Epsilon Piscium (ε Psc), 190 lightyears, class K0III, magnitude 4.27. Has a candidate exoplanet.
- Revati ("rich"), otherwise Zeta Piscium (ζ Psc), 148 lightyears, class A7IV, magnitude 5.21. Quintuple star system.
- Alpherg ("emptying"), otherwise Eta Piscium (η Psc), 349 lightyears, class G7 IIIa, magnitude 3.62. It is a Gamma Cassiopeiae variable with a weak magnetic field.
- Torcular ("thread"), otherwise Omicron Piscium (ο Psc), 258 lightyears, class K0III, magnitude 4.2. It is an evolved red giant star on the horizontal branch.
- Omega Piscium (ω Psc), 106 lightyears, class F4IV, magnitude 4.03. It is an F-type star that is either a subgiant or on the main sequence.
- Gamma Piscium (γ Psc), 138 lightyears, magnitude 3.70. The star hosts an exoplanet which was discovered in 2021. It has a spectral type of G8 III.
- Van Maanen's Star is the closest-known solitary white dwarf to us, with a dim apparent magnitude. It is located about 2° to the south of the star Delta Piscium, with a relatively high proper motion of 2.978″ annually along a position angle of 155.538°. It is closer to the Sun than any other solitary white dwarf. It is too faint to be seen with the naked eye. Like other white dwarfs, it is a very dense star: its mass has been estimated to be about 67% of the Sun's, yet it has only 1% of the Sun's radius. The outer atmosphere has a temperature of approximately 6,110 K, which is relatively cool for a white dwarf. As all white dwarfs steadily radiate away their heat over time, this temperature can be used to estimate its age, thought to be around 3 billion years. It was originally thought to be an F-type star before the properties of white dwarfs were known.

Due to the dimness of these stars, the constellation is essentially invisible in or near any major city due to light pollution.

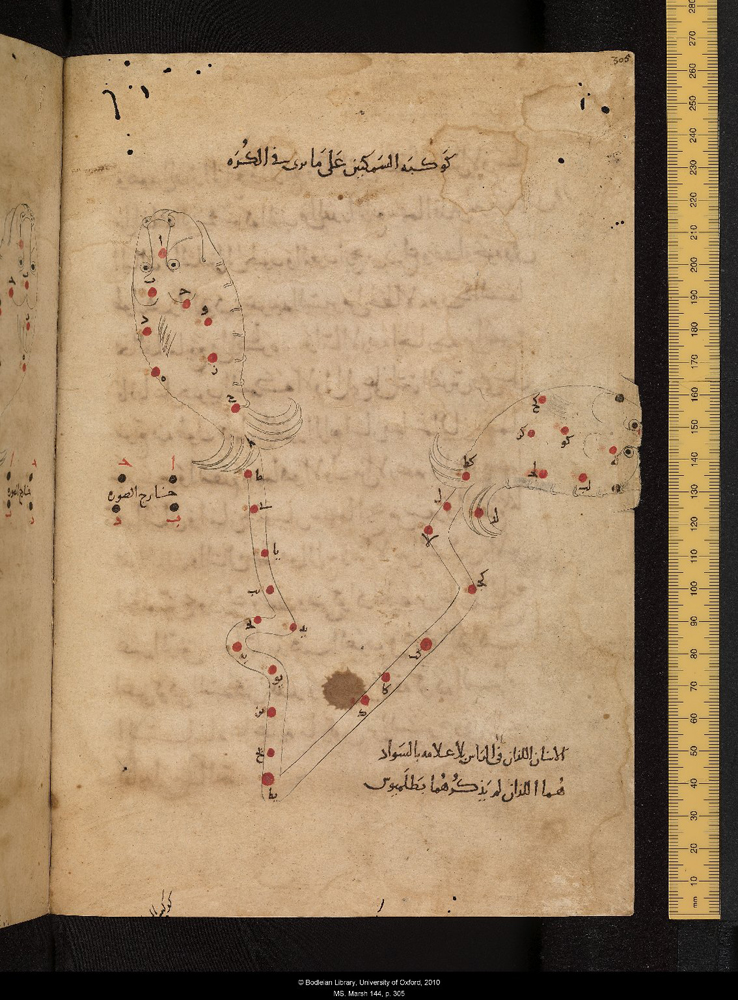
Pisces from Al-Sufi's Book of Fixed Stars, dated 1009-10

=== Named stars ===
Name	Bayer designation	Origin	Meaning	Light Years
Alrescha	α	Arabic	the Cord	157
Fumalsamakah	β	Arabic	The Mouth of the Fish	410
Yunyu	γ	Chinese	Cloud and Rain	135
Waiping	δ	Chinese	Outer Fence	300
Revati and Paushna	ζ	Sanskrit	Prosperous and Pushan	170
Alpherg	η	Arabic	the Emptying	350
Puwuh Atarung	ι	Balinese	Battling Quails	44.73
Torcular	ο	Latin	Northern Wine Press	280
Idigna	π	Sumerian	the Swift River	114
Pili	ω	Chinese	Thunderbolt	106

=== Deep-sky objects ===
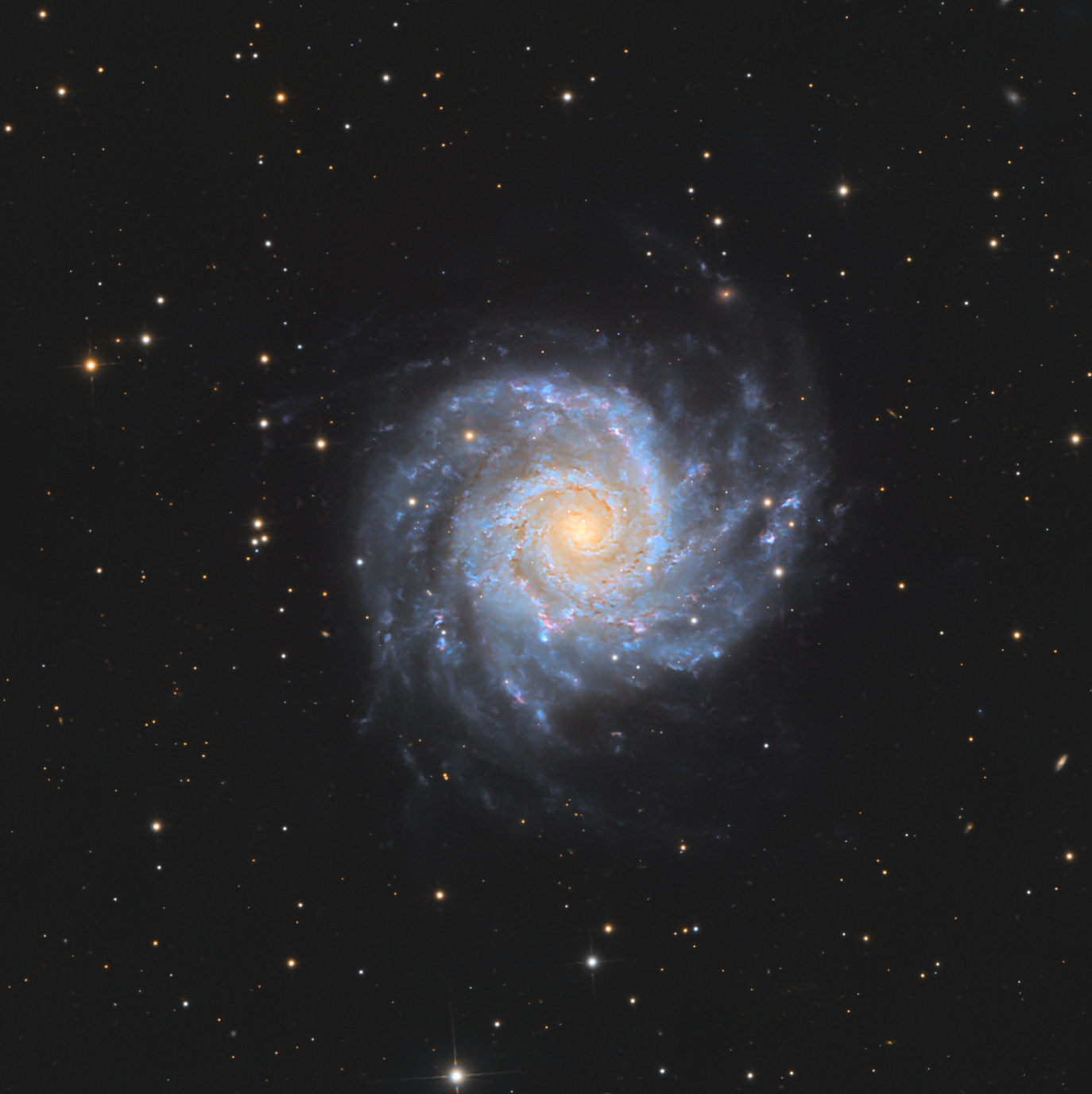
M74, the phantom galaxy in the constellation

M74 is a loosely wound (type Sc) spiral galaxy in Pisces, found at a distance of 30 million light years (redshift 0.0022). It has many clusters of young stars and the associated nebulae, showing extensive regions of star formation. It was discovered by Pierre Méchain, a French astronomer, in 1780. A type II-P supernova was discovered in the outer regions of M74 by Robert Evans in June 2003; the star that underwent the supernova was later identified as a red supergiant with a mass of 8 solar masses. It is the brightest member of the M74 Group.

NGC 488 is an isolated face-on prototypical spiral galaxy. Two supernovae have been observed in the galaxy.

NGC 520 is a pair of colliding galaxies located 105 million light-years away.

CL0024+17 is a massive galaxy cluster that lenses the galaxy behind it, creating arc-shaped images of the background galaxy. The cluster is primarily made up of yellow elliptical and spiral galaxies, at a distance of 3.6 billion light-years from Earth (redshift 0.4), half as far away as the background galaxy, which is at a distance of 5.7 billion light-years (redshift 1.67).

3C 31 is an active galaxy and radio source in Pisces. It is located 237 million light-years away from Earth (redshift 0.0173). Its jets, caused by the supermassive black hole at its center, extend several million light-years in opposing directions, making them some of the largest objects in the universe.

== See also ==
- List of star names in Pisces

== Sources ==
- Ridpath, Ian (1988). Star Tales. James Clarke & Co. ISBN 978-0-718-82695-6.
- Ridpath, Ian; Tirion, Wil (2007). Stars and Planets Guide (4th ed.). Princeton University Press. ISBN 978-0-691-13556-4.
- Eratosthenes; Hyginus; Aratus (2015). Hard, Robin (ed.). Constellation Myths: with Aratus's Phaenomena. OUP Oxford. pp. 83–85. ISBN 978-0-191-02652-2.
- Richard Hinckley Allen, Star Names, Their Lore and Legend, New York, Dover: various dates.
- Staal, Julius D. W. (1988). The New Patterns in the Sky: Myths and Legends of the Stars. The McDonald and Woodward Publishing Company. ISBN 978-0-939923-04-5.
- Thomas Wm. Hamilton, Useful Star Names, Strategic Books, 2008.
