= Beta Lacertae =

G-type giant star in the constellation Lacerta

β Lacertae
- Location of β Lacertae (circled in red)

Observation data Epoch J2000.0 Equinox ICRS
- Constellation: Lacerta
- Right ascension: 22^{h} 23^{m} 33.624^{s}
- Declination: +52° 13′ 44.56″
- Apparent magnitude (V): 4.43

Characteristics
- Evolutionary stage: red clump
- Spectral type: G8 III
- U−B color index: +0.77
- B−V color index: +1.02
- V−R color index: 0.6
- R−I color index: +0.57

Astrometry
Radial velocity (R_{v})	−10.4 ± 0.9 km/s
Proper motion (μ)	RA: −13.25±0.13 mas/yr Dec.: −186.77±0.13 mas/yr
Parallax (π)	19.19±0.16 mas
Distance	170 ± 1 ly (52.1 ± 0.4 pc)
Absolute magnitude (M_{V})	+0.67

Details
Mass	0.97±0.21 M_{☉}
Radius	10.96±0.23 R_{☉}
Luminosity	57.7±3.0 L_{☉}
Surface gravity (log g)	2.43 cgs
Temperature	4803±75 K
Metallicity [Fe/H]	−0.33 dex
Rotational velocity (v sin i)	< 17 km/s
Age	6.76±3.59 Gyr

Other designations
- Alsamaka, β Lac, 3 Lac, BD+51 3358, FK5 844, GC 31310, HD 212496, HIP 110538, HR 8538, SAO 34395, PPM 40598, NLTT 53741

Database references
SIMBAD	data

Beta Lacertae, also named Alsamaka, is the fourth-brightest star in the constellation of Lacerta. Based upon an annual parallax shift of 19.19 mas, it is 170 light-years distant from Earth. At that distance, the visual magnitude is diminished by an extinction factor of 0.17 due to interstellar dust.

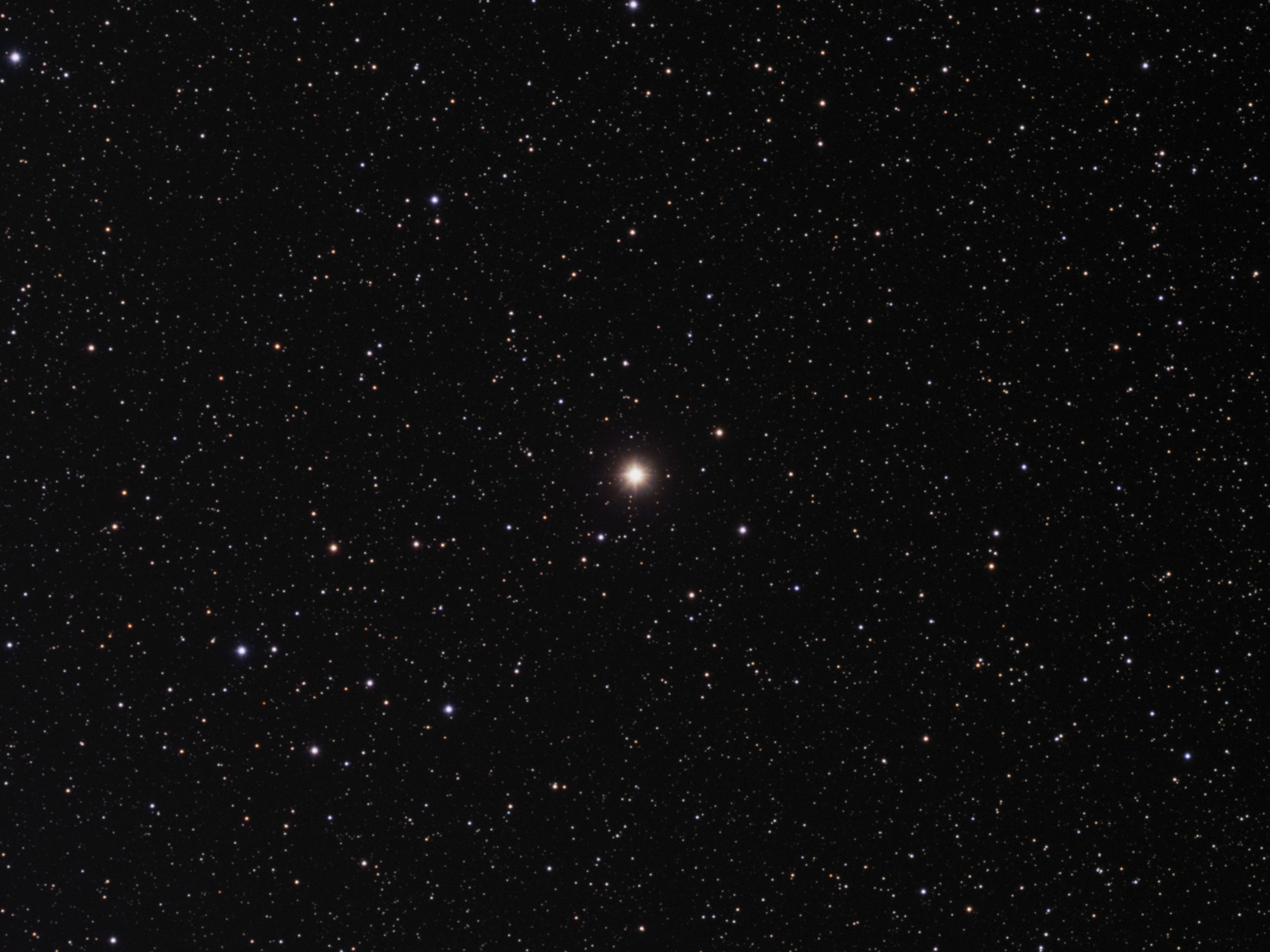
β Lacertae in optical light

This is an evolved G-type giant with an apparent visual magnitude of approximately 4.43. It is a red clump star and the primary component of a suspected binary system, with the pair having an angular separation of 0.2 arcsecond.

== Nomenclature ==
Beta Lacertae (Latinized from β Lacertae, abbreviated Beta Lac, β Lac) is the star's Bayer designation. It was part of the Arabic asterism Al-Samaka al-Ṣuġrā (السمكة الصغرى "the smaller fish") in Lacerta and Andromeda. The IAU Working Group on Star Names adopted the name Alsamaka (lit. "the fish") for this star on 13 August 2026.

In Chinese astronomy, 螣蛇 (Téng Shé), meaning Flying Serpent, refers to an asterism consisting of β Lacertae, α Lacertae, 4 Lacertae, π^{2} Cygni, π^{1} Cygni, HD 206267, ε Cephei, σ Cassiopeiae, ρ Cassiopeiae, τ Cassiopeiae, AR Cassiopeiae, 9 Lacertae, 3 Andromedae, 7 Andromedae, 8 Andromedae, λ Andromedae, κ Andromedae, ι Andromedae and ψ Andromedae. Consequently, the Chinese name for β Lacertae itself is 螣蛇十 (Téng Shé shí, English: the Tenth Star of Flying Serpent).
