= Tau Cassiopeiae =

K-type giant star in the constellation Cassiopeia

τ Cassiopeiae
- Location of τ Cassiopeiae (circled)

Observation data Epoch J2000.0 Equinox J2000.0 (ICRS)
- Constellation: Cassiopeia
- Right ascension: 23^{h} 47^{m} 03.454^{s}
- Declination: +58° 39′ 07.17″
- Apparent magnitude (V): +4.86

Characteristics
- Evolutionary stage: red giant branch
- Spectral type: K1 IIIa
- U−B color index: +1.05
- B−V color index: +1.11
- Variable type: Suspected

Astrometry
| Radial velocity (R_{v}) | −20.48±0.31 km/s |
| Proper motion (μ) | RA: +60.379 mas/yr Dec.: +56.828 mas/yr |
| Parallax (π) | 18.7789±0.0802 mas |
| Distance | 173.7 ± 0.7 ly (53.3 ± 0.2 pc) |
| Absolute magnitude (M_{V}) | 1.269 |

Details
| Mass | 1.44 M_{☉} |
| Radius | 10 R_{☉} |
| Luminosity | 40 L_{☉} |
| Surface gravity (log g) | 2.50±0.09 cgs |
| Temperature | 4,617±77 K |
| Metallicity [Fe/H] | +0.06±0.06 dex |
| Rotational velocity (v sin i) | 5.9 km/s |
| Age | 3.90 Gyr |

Other designations
- τ Cas, 5 Cas, BD+57°2804, FK5 3909, GC 33010, HD 223165, HIP 117301, HR 9008, SAO 35763

Database references
| SIMBAD | data |

Tau Cassiopeiae is a solitary, orange hued star in the northern constellation of Cassiopeia. Its name is a Bayer designation that is Latinized from τ Cassiopeiae, and abbreviated Tau Cas or τ Cas. This star is bright enough to be seen with the naked eye, having an apparent visual magnitude of +4.86. Based upon an annual parallax shift of 18.78 mas as seen from Earth, this star is located about 173.7 light-years (53.3 pc) from the Sun. It is drifting closer with a radial velocity of −20 km/s.

The spectrum of this star indicates it is an evolved, K-type giant star with a stellar classification of K1 IIIa. It is a suspected variable star of unknown type. Tau Cassiopeiae is 3.9 billion years old with about 1.44 times the mass of the Sun and 10 times the Sun's radius. It is radiating 40 times the Sun's luminosity from its expanded photosphere at an effective temperature of around 4,617 K.

== Naming ==
In Chinese, 螣蛇 (Téng Shé), meaning Flying Serpent, refers to an asterism consisting of τ Cassiopeiae, α Lacertae, 4 Lacertae, π^{2} Cygni, π^{1} Cygni, HD 206267, ε Cephei, β Lacertae, σ Cassiopeiae, ρ Cassiopeiae, AR Cassiopeiae, 9 Lacertae, 3 Andromedae, 7 Andromedae, 8 Andromedae, λ Andromedae, κ Andromedae, ι Andromedae, and ψ Andromedae. Consequently, the Chinese name for τ Cassiopeiae itself is 螣蛇十三 (Téng Shé shísān, English: the Thirteenth Star of Flying Serpent).
