= Epsilon Cephei =

Star in the constellation Cepheus

- Location of ε Cephei (circled in red)

Observation data Epoch J2000 Equinox ICRS
- Constellation: Cepheus
- Right ascension: 22^{h} 15^{m} 02.197^{s}
- Declination: +57° 02′ 36.85″
- Apparent magnitude (V): 4.15 to 4.21

Characteristics
- Evolutionary stage: main sequence
- Spectral type: F0 V (Sr II) or F0 IV
- U−B color index: +0.073
- B−V color index: +0.277
- Variable type: δ Sct

Astrometry
| Radial velocity (R_{v}) | −4.7±0.8 km/s |
| Proper motion (μ) | RA: +423.159 mas/yr Dec.: +52.691 mas/yr |
| Parallax (π) | 38.1598±0.2432 mas |
| Distance | 85.5 ± 0.5 ly (26.2 ± 0.2 pc) |
| Absolute magnitude (M_{V}) | +2.13 |

Details

ε Cep Aa
| Mass | 1.64 M_{☉} |
| Radius | 1.86 R_{☉} |
| Luminosity | 11.65 L_{☉} |
| Surface gravity (log g) | 4.11±0.14 cgs |
| Temperature | 7,514±255 K |
| Metallicity [Fe/H] | +0.08 dex |
| Rotational velocity (v sin i) | 91 km/s |
| Age | 1.097 Gyr |

ε Cep Ab
| Mass | 0.57 M_{☉} |

Other designations
- ε Cephei, 23 Cephei, BD+56 2741, HD 211336, HIP 109857, HR 8494, SAO 34227

Database references
| SIMBAD | data |

Epsilon Cephei is a star in the northern constellation of Cepheus. Its name is a Bayer designation that is Latinized from ε Cephei, and abbreviated Epsilon Cep or ε Cep. Based upon an annual parallax shift of 38.16 mas as seen from the Earth, it is located about 85.5 light-years (26.2 pc) from the Sun. The star is visible to the naked eye with an apparent visual magnitude that varies around 4.18.

== Properties ==
=== Physical characteristics ===
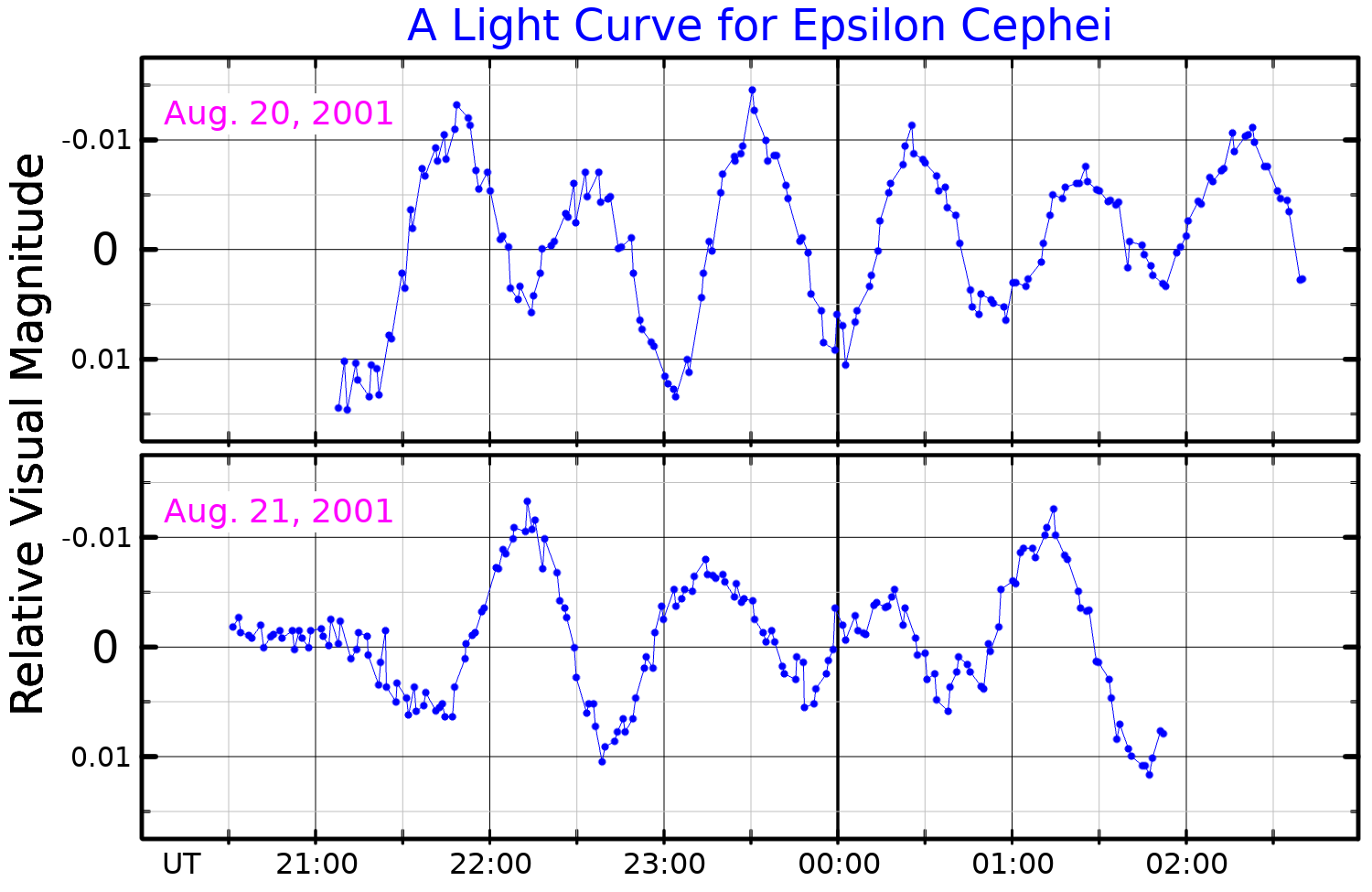
A visual band light curve for Epsilon Cephei, adapted from Bruntt et al. (2007)

This is a yellow-white hued, F-type star with a stellar classification of F0 V (Sr II) or F0 IV. Thus it may either be an F-type main sequence star showing an abundance excess of strontium, or it could be a more evolved subgiant star. It is a Delta Scuti variable star that cycles between magnitudes 4.15 and 4.21 every 59.388 minutes. The star displays an infrared excess, indicating the presence of a debris disk with a temperature of 65 K orbiting at a radius of 62 AU. This dust has a combined mass equal to 6.6% of the Earth's mass.

=== Binary ===
There is a faint companion star at an angular separation of 330±50 mas along a position angle of 90°±10°. This corresponds to a projected physical separation of 8.6±1.4 AU. The probability of a random star being situated this close to Epsilon Cephei is about one in a million, so it is most likely physically associated. If so, then the debris disk is probably circumbinary. The fact that this companion was not detected during the Hipparcos mission may indicate its orbit has a high eccentricity. The companion star has a K-band magnitude of 7.8 and is probably of class K8–M2.

== Naming ==
In Chinese, 螣蛇 (Téng Shé), meaning Flying Serpent, refers to an asterism consisting of ε Cephei, α Lacertae, 4 Lacertae, π^{2} Cygni, π^{1} Cygni, HD 206267, β Lacertae, σ Cassiopeiae, ρ Cassiopeiae, τ Cassiopeiae, AR Cassiopeiae, 9 Lacertae, 3 Andromedae, 7 Andromedae, 8 Andromedae, λ Andromedae, κ Andromedae, ι Andromedae, and ψ Andromedae. Consequently, the Chinese name for ε Cephei itself is 螣蛇九 (Téng Shé jiǔ, English: the Ninth Star of Flying Serpent).
