= Pi1 Cygni =

Star in the constellation Cygnus

Pi^{1} Cygni
- Location of π^{1} Cygni (circled in red)

Observation data Epoch J2000.0 Equinox J2000.0 (ICRS)
- Constellation: Cygnus
- Right ascension: 21^{h} 42^{m} 05.66458^{s}
- Declination: +51° 11′ 22.6415″
- Apparent magnitude (V): 4.66

Characteristics
- Spectral type: B3 IV
- B−V color index: −0.11

Astrometry
| Radial velocity (R_{v}) | −5.8±3.1 km/s |
| Proper motion (μ) | RA: +5.29 mas/yr Dec.: −1.78 mas/yr |
| Parallax (π) | 1.89±0.15 mas |
| Distance | 1,700 ± 100 ly (530 ± 40 pc) |
| Absolute magnitude (M_{V}) | −3.91 |

Details
| Mass | 10.1±0.1 M_{☉} |
| Radius | 15.1 R_{☉} |
| Luminosity | 6,433 L_{☉} |
| Surface gravity (log g) | 4.08 cgs |
| Temperature | 14,863 K |
| Rotational velocity (v sin i) | 55 km/s |
| Age | 25.1±0.8 Myr |

Other designations
- Azelfafage, π^{1} Cyg, 80 Cyg, BD+50°3410, FK5 3733, HD 206672, HIP 107136, HR 8301, SAO 33665

Database references
| SIMBAD | data |

Pi^{1} Cygni is a star in the northern constellation of Cygnus. It has the proper name Azelfafage, pronounced /əˈzɛlfəfeɪdʒ/. This system is visible to the naked eye, having an apparent visual magnitude of 4.66. The distance to this star can be roughly gauged by its annual parallax shift of 1.89 mas, which yields a separation of around 1,700 light years from the Sun, give or take a hundred light years.

== Nomenclature ==
π^{1} Cygni, which is Latinised to Pi^{1} Cygni and abbreviated Pi^{1} Cyg or π^{1} Cyg, is the star's Bayer designation. The designations of the two components as Pi^{1} Cygni A and B derive from the convention used by the Washington Multiplicity Catalog (WMC) for multiple star systems, and adopted by the International Astronomical Union (IAU).

It bore the traditional name Azelfafage, derived from the Arabic al-sulaḥfāh, the tortoise, originally a name for Lyra that was misattributed to a star in Cygnus. R. H. Allen's 1899 book Star Names incorrectly states that the name is derived from ظلف الفرس Dhilf al-faras meaning "the horse track" or (probably) ذيل الدجاجة Dhail al-dajāja^{h} meaning "the tail of the hen". In 2016, the IAU organized a Working Group on Star Names (WGSN) to catalogue and standardize proper names for stars. The WGSN approved the name Azelfafage for Pi^{1} Cygni on 12 September 2016 and it is now so included in the List of IAU-approved Star Names.

In Chinese, 螣蛇 (Téng Shé), meaning Flying Serpent, refers to an asterism consisting of Pi^{1} Cygni, Alpha Lacertae, 4 Lacertae, Pi^{2} Cygni, HD 206267, Epsilon Cephei, Beta Lacertae, Sigma Cassiopeiae, Rho Cassiopeiae, Tau Cassiopeiae, AR Cassiopeiae, 9 Lacertae, 3 Andromedae, 7 Andromedae, 8 Andromedae, Lambda Andromedae, Kappa Andromedae, Psi Andromedae and Iota Andromedae. Consequently, the Chinese name for Pi^{1} Cygni itself is 螣蛇四 (Téng Shé sì, English: the Fourth Star of Flying Serpent).

== Properties ==
Pi^{1} Cygni has been described as a single-lined spectroscopic binary with a close, circular orbit, having a period of just 26.33 days. However, a 2020 paper finds no radial velocity variations on the timescale of the published orbit.

The visible and possibly the only component is a somewhat evolved B-type subgiant star with a stellar classification of B3 IV. It has an estimated 10 times the mass of the Sun and around 5.6 times the Sun's radius. The star radiates 16,538 times the solar luminosity from its outer atmosphere at an effective temperature of roughly 18,360 K. It is about 25 million years old and is spinning with a projected rotational velocity of 55 km/s.
