= Kappa Andromedae =

Star in the constellation of Andromeda

- Location of κ Andromedae (circled)

Observation data Epoch J2000 Equinox ICRS
- Constellation: Andromeda
- Right ascension: 23^{h} 40^{m} 24.508^{s}
- Declination: +44° 20′ 02.16″
- Apparent magnitude (V): 4.139

Characteristics
- Evolutionary stage: main sequence
- Spectral type: A0 V
- U−B color index: −0.221
- B−V color index: −0.067

Astrometry
| Radial velocity (R_{v}) | −12.7±0.8 km/s |
| Proper motion (μ) | RA: +79.998 mas/yr Dec.: −19.011 mas/yr |
| Parallax (π) | 19.4064±0.2104 mas |
| Distance | 168 ± 2 ly (51.5 ± 0.6 pc) |
| Absolute magnitude (M_{V}) | +0.59 |

Details
| Mass | 2.768+0.1 −0.109 M_{☉} |
| Radius | 2.303+0.039 −0.016 R_{☉} (equatorial); 1.959+0.033 −0.028 (polar) R_{☉} |
| Luminosity | 62.60+9.83 −2.23 L_{☉} |
| Surface gravity (log g) | 3.968+0.028 −0.025 cgs (equatorial); 4.296+0.019 −0.012 (polar) cgs |
| Temperature | 10,342+384 −138 K (equatorial); 12,050+448 −39 (polar) K |
| Rotational velocity (v sin i) | 142.2+13.1 −21.1 km/s |
| Age | 47±7 Myr |

Other designations
- Kaffalmusalsala, κ And, 19 Andromedae, BD+43°4522, FK5 1619, HD 222439, HIP 116805, HR 8976, SAO 53264, PPM 64525

Database references
| SIMBAD | data |
| Exoplanet Archive | data |

Kappa Andromedae, Latinized from κ Andromedae, formally named Kaffalmusalsala, is a star in the northern constellation of Andromeda. It is visible to the naked eye with an apparent visual magnitude of 4.1. Based on the star's ranking on the Bortle Dark-Sky Scale, it is luminous enough to be visible from the suburbs and from urban outskirts, but not from brightly lit inner city regions. Parallax measurements place it at a distance of approximately 168 light-years (52 parsecs). It is drifting closer with a radial velocity of −13 km/s, and there is a high likelihood (86%) that it is a member of the Beta Pictoris moving group. The star has one known exoplanet, Kappa Andromedae b.

== Naming ==
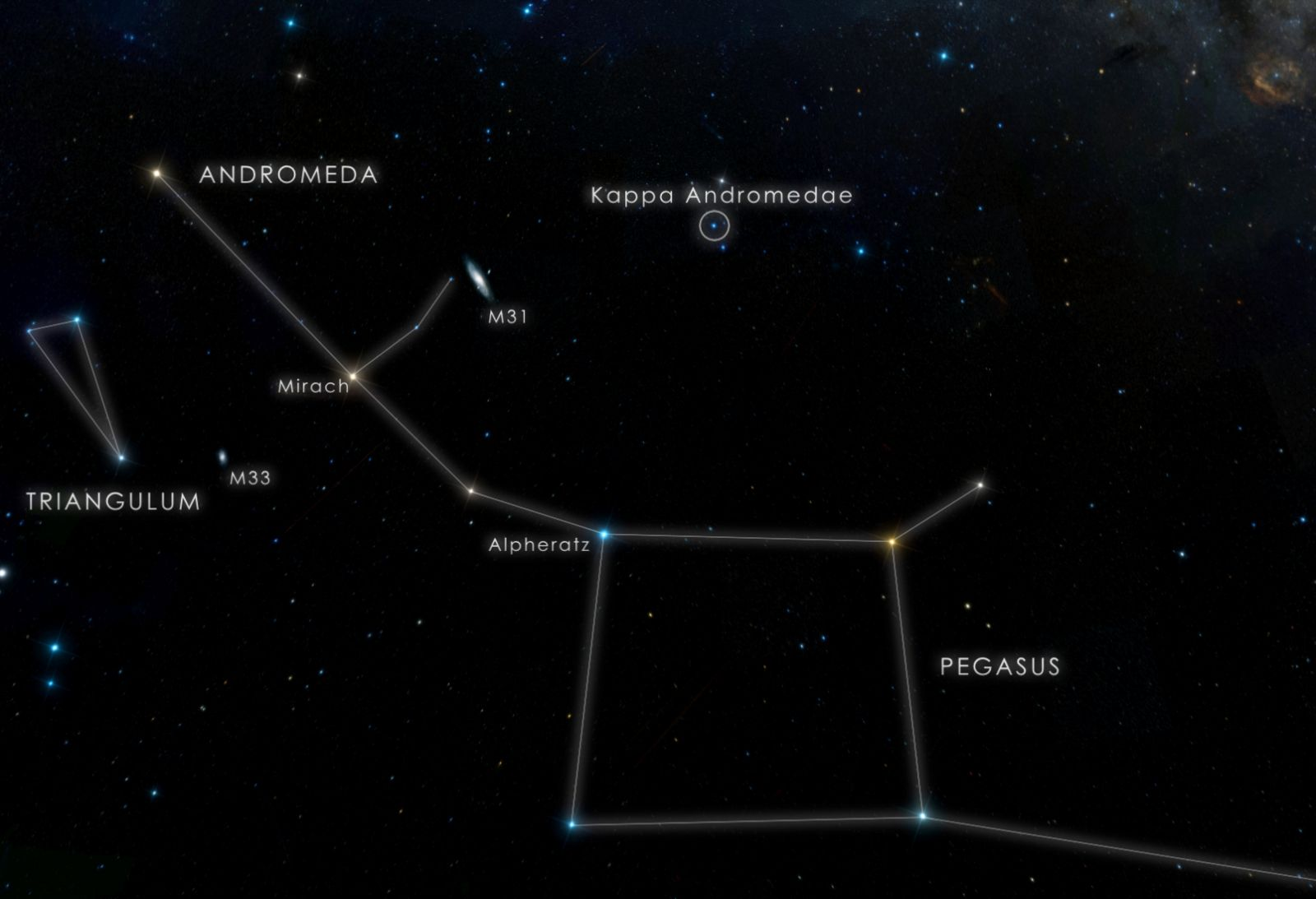
Location of κ Andromedae

In traditional Arabic astronomy, the stars ι Andromedae, κ Andromedae, and λ Andromedae were known as Kaff al-Musalsala, the hand of the chained woman (i.e. Andromeda), and as Ra’s al-Nāqa, the head of the she-camel. The IAU Working Group on Star Names approved the name Kaffalmusalsala for κ Andromedae on 8 May 2025 and it is now so entered in the IAU Catalog of Star Names; the name Rasalnaqa was given to ι Andromedae.

In Chinese, 螣蛇 (Téng Shé), meaning Flying Serpent, refers to an asterism consisting of κ Andromedae, α Lacertae, 4 Lacertae, π^{2} Cygni, π^{1} Cygni, HD 206267, ε Cephei, β Lacertae, σ Cassiopeiae, ρ Cassiopeiae, τ Cassiopeiae, AR Cassiopeiae, 9 Lacertae, 3 Andromedae, 7 Andromedae, 8 Andromedae, λ Andromedae, ι Andromedae, and ψ Andromedae. Consequently, the Chinese name for κ Andromedae itself is 螣蛇二十一 (Téng Shé èrshíyī, English: the Twenty First Star of Flying Serpent).

== Properties ==
The stellar classification of Kappa Andromedae is A0 V indicating that it is a main sequence star fusing hydrogen into helium at its core. The star has an estimated 2.8 times the mass of the Sun and is radiating 62.6 times the Sun's luminosity. It is spinning rapidly, with a projected rotational velocity of 162 km/s. Its true rotational velocity is 283.8 km/s, which is about 85% of its critical rotation rate (the rate at which it would break up). With such a rapid rotation rate, the star is deformed into an oblate spheroid, such that while the polar radius is 1.959 R_{☉}, the equatorial radius is significantly larger, at 2.303 R_{☉}. The outer envelope of the star is radiating energy into space with an effective temperature of 10,342 K at the equator and 12,050 K at its poles, producing a blue-white hue.

The age of Kappa Andromedae has been the subject of debate. The discovery paper for Kappa Andromedae b argued that the primary's kinematics are consistent with membership in the Columba Association, which would imply a system age of 20-50 million years, while a subsequent work derived an older age of 220±100 million years based on the star's position on the Hertzsprung-Russell diagram position assuming that the star is not a fast rotator viewed pole-on. Direct measurements of the star later showed that Kappa Andromedae A is in fact a rapid rotator viewed nearly pole-on and yield a best-estimated age of 47^{+27}_{−40} million years. Modelling of the companion Kappa Andromedae b further constrains the age to 47±7 million years.

== Substellar companion ==
In November 2012, members of the Strategic Explorations of Exoplanets and Disks with Subaru (SEEDS) survey reported the discovery of a faint, directly-imaged companion Kappa Andromedae b. Follow-up photometry and spectroscopy of kappa And b with the Subaru Telescope, Keck Observatory, and Large Binocular Telescope constrained its mass to be about 13 Jupiter masses, temperature to be between 1700 K and 2150 K, and orbit to be highly eccentric with a semimajor axis likely greater than about 75 AU. The companion's spectrum shows evidence for water and carbon monoxide molecules and suggests the object has a low surface gravity.

The Kappa Andromedae planetary system
| Companion (in order from star) | Mass | Semimajor axis (AU) | Orbital period (years) | Eccentricity | Inclination (°) | Radius |
|---|---|---|---|---|---|---|
| b | 17.3±1.8 M_{J} | 104+30 −46 | 520+450 −230 | 0.80+0.05 −0.08 | 132.0 | 1.42±0.06 R_{J} |

== See also ==
- List of directly imaged exoplanets
- Super-Jupiter
