= Pi2 Cygni =

Star system in the constellation Cygnus

Pi^{2} Cygni
- Location of π^{2} Cygni (circled in red)

Observation data Epoch J2000.0 Equinox J2000.0 (ICRS)
- Constellation: Cygnus
- Right ascension: 21^{h} 46^{m} 47.610^{s}
- Declination: +49° 18′ 34.454″
- Apparent magnitude (V): 4.24

Characteristics
- Spectral type: B2.5 III
- U−B color index: −0.79
- B−V color index: −0.125
- Variable type: β Cep

Astrometry
Radial velocity (R_{v})	−12.3 km/s
Proper motion (μ)	RA: +5.478 mas/yr Dec.: −3.121 mas/yr
Parallax (π)	2.2801±0.1353 mas
Distance	1,430 ± 80 ly (440 ± 30 pc)
Absolute magnitude (M_{V})	−3.39

Orbit
Period (P)	72.0162 d
Eccentricity (e)	0.34
Periastron epoch (T)	2428410.6 JD
Argument of periastron (ω) (secondary)	238.1°
Semi-amplitude (K_{1}) (primary)	7.8 km/s

Details

π^{2} Cyg A
Mass	8.4±0.4 M_{☉}
Radius	7.1 R_{☉}
Luminosity (bolometric)	8,442 L_{☉}
Surface gravity (log g)	3.69±0.16 cgs
Temperature	20,815±1,057 K
Metallicity [Fe/H]	0.04±0.09 dex
Rotational velocity (v sin i)	50±5 km/s
Age	33.2±5.8 Myr

Other designations
- π^{2} Cyg, 81 Cyg, BD+48°3504, FK5 821, HD 207330, HIP 107533, HR 8335, SAO 51293

Database references
SIMBAD	data

Pi^{2} Cygni is a candidate triple star system in the northern constellation of Cygnus. Is name is a Bayer designation that is Latinized from π^{2} Cygni and abbreviated Pi^{2} Cyg or π^{2} Cyg. This system is visible to the naked eye as a point of light about 2.5° east-northeast of the open cluster M39, having an apparent visual magnitude of 4.24. Based upon an annual parallax shift of 2.28 mas, it is located at a distance of approximately 1,430 light years from the Sun.

Pi^{2} Cygni has been described as a single-lined spectroscopic binary with an orbital period of 72.0162 days and an eccentricity of 0.34. However, a 2020 paper found no radial velocity variations on the timescale of the published orbit.

The purported primary, component A, is a B-type giant star with a stellar classification of B2.5 III. It is a Beta Cephei variable with an estimated 8.4 times the mass of the Sun and around 7.1 times the Sun's radius. The star is roughly 33 million years old and is spinning with a projected rotational velocity of 50 km/s. It is radiating 8,442 times the solar luminosity from its outer atmosphere at an effective temperature of around 20,815 K.

The third member of this system is a magnitude 5.98 star at an angular separation of 0.10 arc seconds along a position angle of 129°, as of 1996.

== Historical names ==
In Chinese, 螣蛇 (Téng Shé), meaning Flying Serpent, refers to an asterism consisting of π^{2} Cygni, α Lacertae, 4 Lacertae, π^{1} Cygni, HD 206267, ε Cephei, β Lacertae, σ Cassiopeiae, ρ Cassiopeiae, τ Cassiopeiae, AR Cassiopeiae, 9 Lacertae, 3 Andromedae, 7 Andromedae, 8 Andromedae, λ Andromedae, κ Andromedae, ψ Andromedae and ι Andromedae. Consequently, the Chinese name for π^{2} Cygni itself is 螣蛇三 (Téng Shé sān, English: the Third Star of Flying Serpent).
