= Sigma Cassiopeiae =

Star in the constellation Cassiopeia

σ Cassiopeiae
- Location of σ Cassiopeiae (circled)

Observation data Epoch J2000.0 Equinox ICRS
- Constellation: Cassiopeia
- σ Cas A
- Right ascension: 23^{h} 59^{m} 00.538^{s}
- Declination: +55° 45′ 17.75″
- Apparent magnitude (V): 5.01
- σ Cas B
- Right ascension: 23^{h} 59^{m} 00.331^{s}
- Declination: +55° 45′ 20.37″
- Apparent magnitude (V): 7.24

Characteristics

σ Cas A
- Spectral type: B2 IV
- U−B color index: −0.82
- B−V color index: −0.07
- Variable type: β Cep

σ Cas B
- Spectral type: B3 V

Astrometry

σ Cas A
Radial velocity (R_{v})	−12.6 km/s
Proper motion (μ)	RA: +9.956 mas/yr Dec.: −4.492 mas/yr
Parallax (π)	2.7419±0.1491 mas
Distance	1,190 ± 60 ly (360 ± 20 pc)
Absolute magnitude (M_{V})	−3.90
Radial velocity (R_{v})	−5.0 km/s
Proper motion (μ)	RA: +8.651 mas/yr Dec.: −3.739 mas/yr
Parallax (π)	2.2572±0.0558 mas
Distance	1,440 ± 40 ly (440 ± 10 pc)
Absolute magnitude (M_{V})	−1.7

Details

A
Mass	12 M_{☉}
Radius	11.3 R_{☉}
Luminosity	25,000 L_{☉}
Surface gravity (log g)	3.6 cgs
Temperature	21,000 K
Rotational velocity (v sin i)	170 km/s
Age	15.8 Myr

Other designations
- σ Cas, 8 Cassiopeiae, BD+54°3082, HD 224572, HIP 118243, HR 9071, SAO 35947, ADS 17140, CCDM J23591+5546

Database references
SIMBAD	data
- A
- B

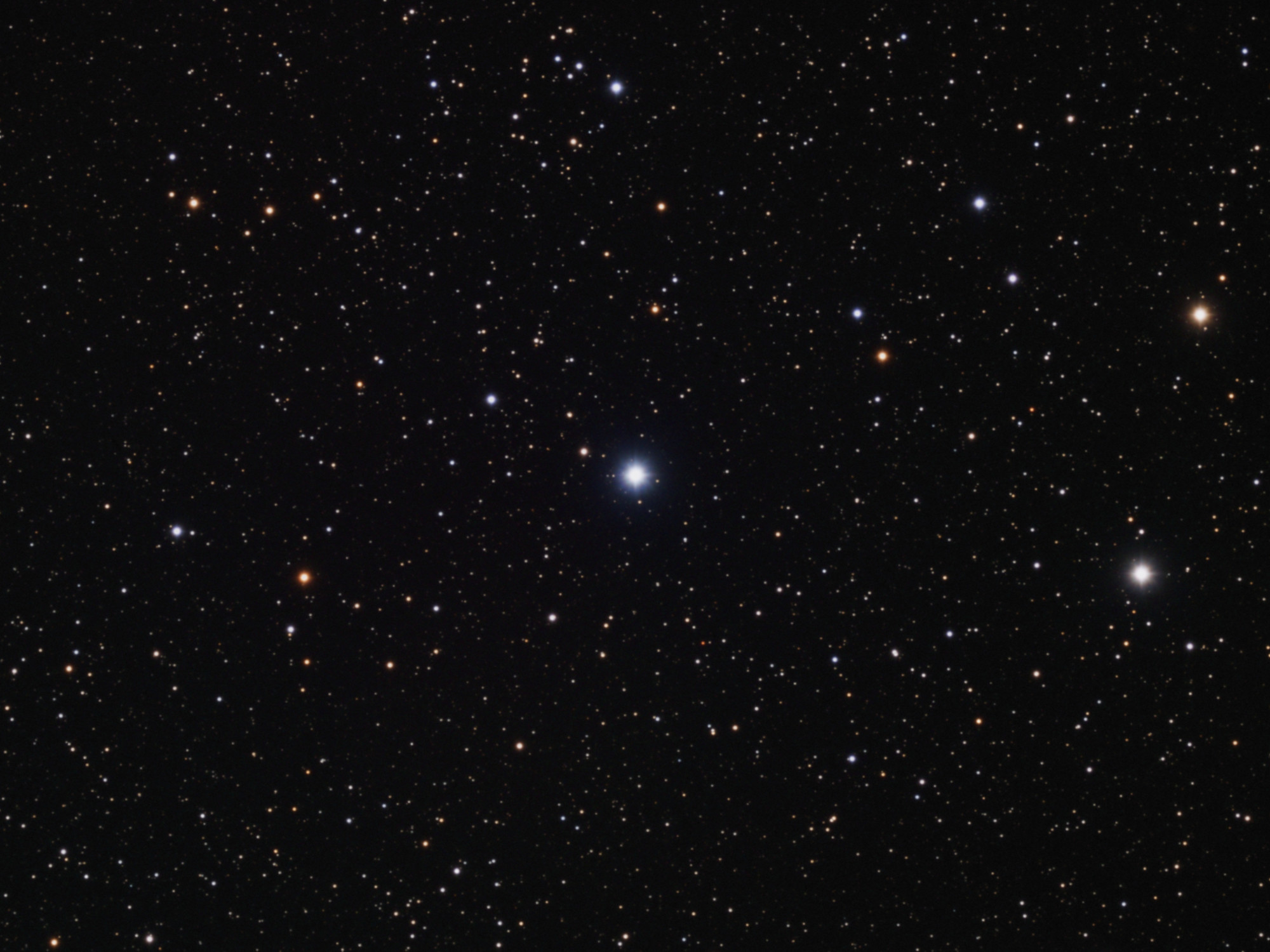
σ Cassiopeiae in optical light

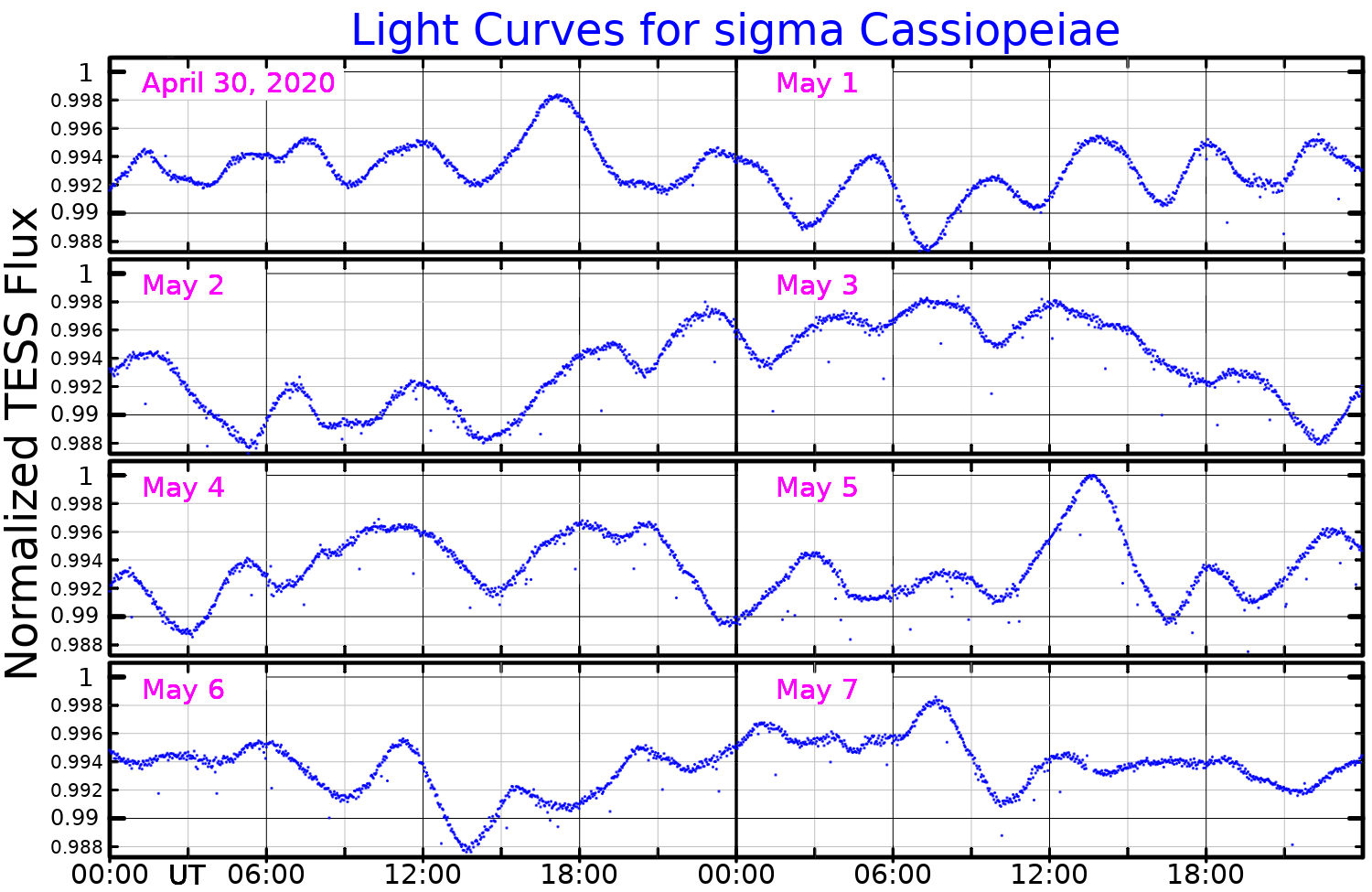
Light curves for Sigma Cassiopeiae, plotted from TESS data.

Sigma Cassiopeiae is a binary star system in the northern constellation of Cassiopeia. Its name is a Bayer designation that is Latinized from σ Cassiopeiae, and abbreviated Sigma Cas or σ Cas. The pair have a combined apparent magnitude of +4.88, making it visible to the naked eye. Based on Parallax measurements, it is located at a distance of 1,200 to 1,400 light years from Earth.

The primary component, σ Cassiopeiae A, has an apparent magnitude of +5.01 and presents as a subgiant star with a stellar classification of B2 IV. It is a candidate Beta Cephei variable and is rotating rapidly. Its companion, σ Cassiopeiae B, is a main sequence dwarf with a class of B3 V and an apparent magnitude of +7.14. The two stars are three arcseconds apart.

== Naming ==
In Chinese, 螣蛇 (Téng Shé), meaning Flying Serpent, refers to an asterism consisting of σ Cassiopeiae, α Lacertae, 4 Lacertae, π^{2} Cygni, π^{1} Cygni, HD 206267, ε Cephei, β Lacertae, ρ Cassiopeiae, τ Cassiopeiae, AR Cassiopeiae, 9 Lacertae, 3 Andromedae, 7 Andromedae, 8 Andromedae, λ Andromedae, κ Andromedae, ι Andromedae, and ψ Andromedae. Consequently, the Chinese name for σ Cassiopeiae itself is 螣蛇十一 (Téng Shé shíyī, English: the Eleventh Star of Flying Serpent).
