= Rho Cassiopeiae =

Yellow hypergiant star in the constellation Cassiopeia

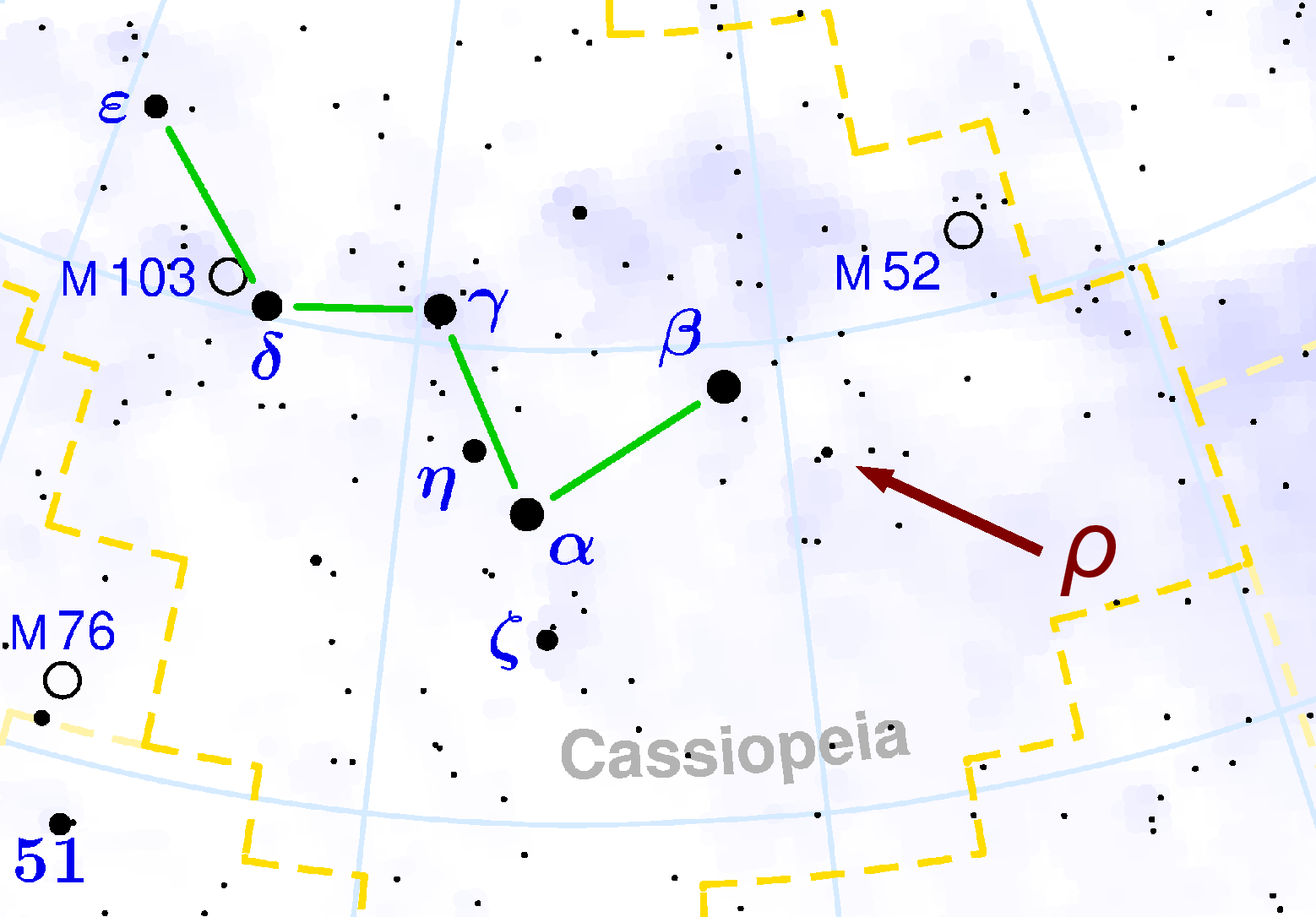
- Location of Rho Cassiopeiae in the Cassiopeia constellation

Observation data Epoch J2000 Equinox ICRS
- Constellation: Cassiopeia
- Right ascension: 23^{h} 54^{m} 23.033^{s}
- Declination: +57° 29′ 57.77″
- Apparent magnitude (V): 4.1 to 6.2

Characteristics
- Evolutionary stage: Yellow hypergiant
- Spectral type: G2 0 (F8pIa – K0pIa-0)‍
- U−B color index: 1.15
- B−V color index: 1.26
- Variable type: SRd

Astrometry
| Radial velocity (R_{v}) | −47 km/s |
| Proper motion (μ) | RA: −4.699 mas/yr Dec.: −3.112 mas/yr |
| Parallax (π) | 0.9470±0.2021 mas |
| Distance | 9,200+340 −330 ly (2,810+104 −102 pc) |
| Absolute magnitude (M_{V}) | –9.5 |

Details
| Mass | 40 M_{☉} |
| Radius | 634±24 (2023); 345 – 773 R_{☉} |
| Luminosity | 680,000+220,000 −210,000 L_{☉} |
| Surface gravity (log g) | 0.1 cgs |
| Temperature | 4,500 – 8,000 K |
| Metallicity [Fe/H] | 0.3 dex |
| Rotational velocity (v sin i) | 25 km/s |
| Age | 4 – 6 Myr |

Other designations
- ρ Cas, 7 Cassiopeiae, BD+56°3111, FK5 899, GC 33160, HD 224014, HIP 117863, HR 9045, SAO 35879, PPM 42338

Database references
| SIMBAD | data |

Rho Cassiopeiae is a yellow hypergiant star in the constellation Cassiopeia. Its name is a Bayer designation, pronounced /ˌroʊ kæsiəˈpiːaɪ, -sioʊ-, -iː/. This star is about 8,000 light-years (2,500 pc) distant, yet can still be seen by the naked eye as it is over 300,000 times brighter than the Sun. On average it has an absolute magnitude of −9.5, making it one of the most luminous stars known in visual wavelengths. Its diameter varies between about 300 and 800 times that of the Sun, or 1.4 to 3.7 times the size of Earth's orbit.

Louisa Wells discovered that the star's brightness varies, and that discovery was published in 1901. Rho Cassiopeiae is a single star, and is categorized as a semiregular variable. As a yellow hypergiant, it is one of the rarest types of stars. Only a few dozen are known in the Milky Way, but it is not the only one in its constellation which also contains V509 Cassiopeiae.

== Naming ==
ρ Cassiopeiae is the Bayer designation for this star, often Latinized to Rho Cassiopeiae, and abbreviated Rho Cas or ρ Cas. It was established in 1603 as part of the Uranometria, a star catalog produced by Johann Bayer, who placed this star in the sixth magnitude class. The star catalog by John Flamsteed published in 1712, which orders the stars in each constellation by their right ascension, gave this star the Flamsteed designation 7 Cassiopeiae.

Rho Cassiopeiae has no traditional proper name, and as of 2026 it has not been assigned an official name by the IAU.

ρ Cassiopeiae is a member of the Chinese constellation Flying Serpent 螣蛇 (Téng Shé), in the Encampment mansion. In order, the 22 member stars are α and 4 Lacertae, π^{2} and π^{1} Cygni, stars 5 and 6, HD 206267, 13 and ε Cephei, β Lacertae, σ, ρ, τ, and AR Cassiopeiae, 9 Lacertae, 3, 7, 8, λ, ψ, κ, and ι Andromedae. Consequently, the Chinese name for ρ Cassiopeiae is 螣蛇十二 (Téng Shé shíèr, English: the Twelfth Star of Flying Serpent).

== Observation ==
Rho Cassiopeiae is the second brightest yellow hypergiant in the sky, the brightest being V382 Carinae, although Rho Cassiopeiae is mostly visible only in the northern hemisphere and V382 Carinae mostly only in the southern hemisphere.

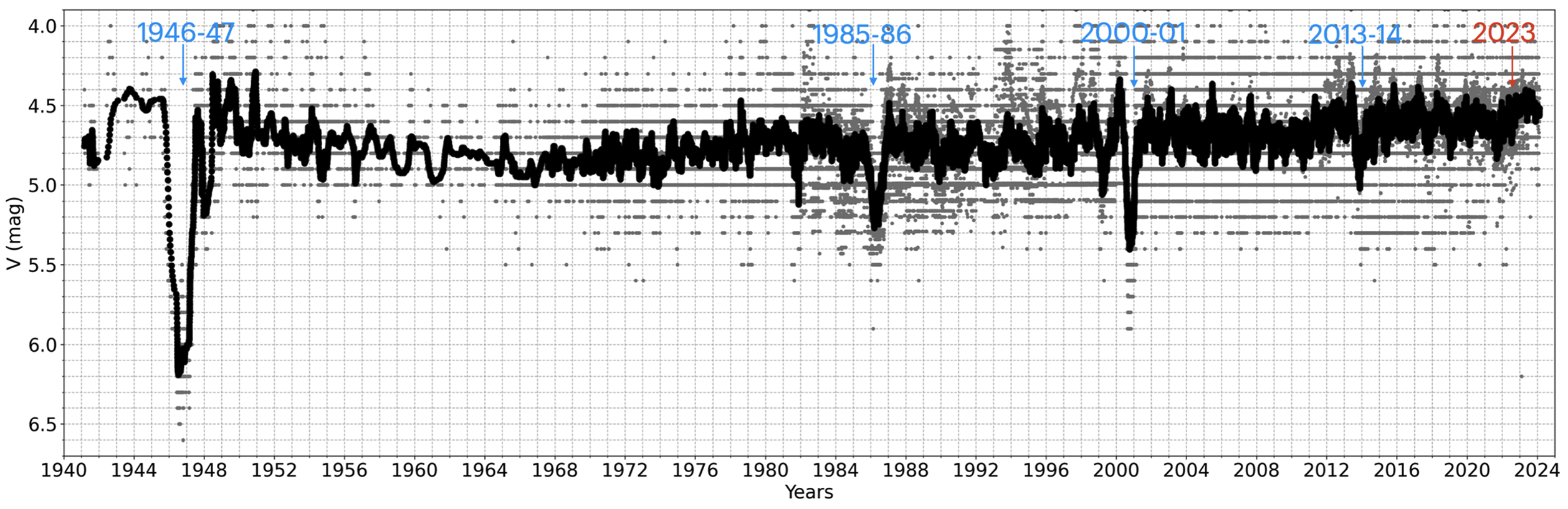
Visual light curve for Rho Cas from 1940 to 2024

Rho Cas was first described as variable in 1901. Its spectrum was classified only as "pec." with a small but definite range of variation. Its nature continued to be unclear during the deep visual minimum in 1946, although it was presumed to be related to the detection of an expanding shell around the star. The spectrum developed lower excitation features described as typical of an M star rather than the previous F8 class. The nature of Rho Cas was eventually clarified as a massive luminous unstable star, pulsating and losing mass, and occasionally becoming obscured by strong bouts of mass loss.

Rho Cas usually has an apparent magnitude near 4.5, but in 1946 it unexpectedly dimmed to 6th magnitude and cooled by over 3,000 Kelvin, before returning to its previous brightness. A similar eruption was recorded in 1893, suggesting that it undergoes these eruptions approximately once every 50 years. This happened again in 2000–2001, when it was observed by the William Herschel Telescope.

In 2013, a shell ejection produced dramatic spectral changes and a drop of about half a magnitude at visual wavelengths. Weak emission lines of metals and doubled H-α absorption lines were detected in late 2014, and unusual tripled absorption lines in 2017. The brightness peaked at magnitude 4.3 before fading to 5th magnitude. In 2018 it brightened again to magnitude 4.2.

== Distance ==
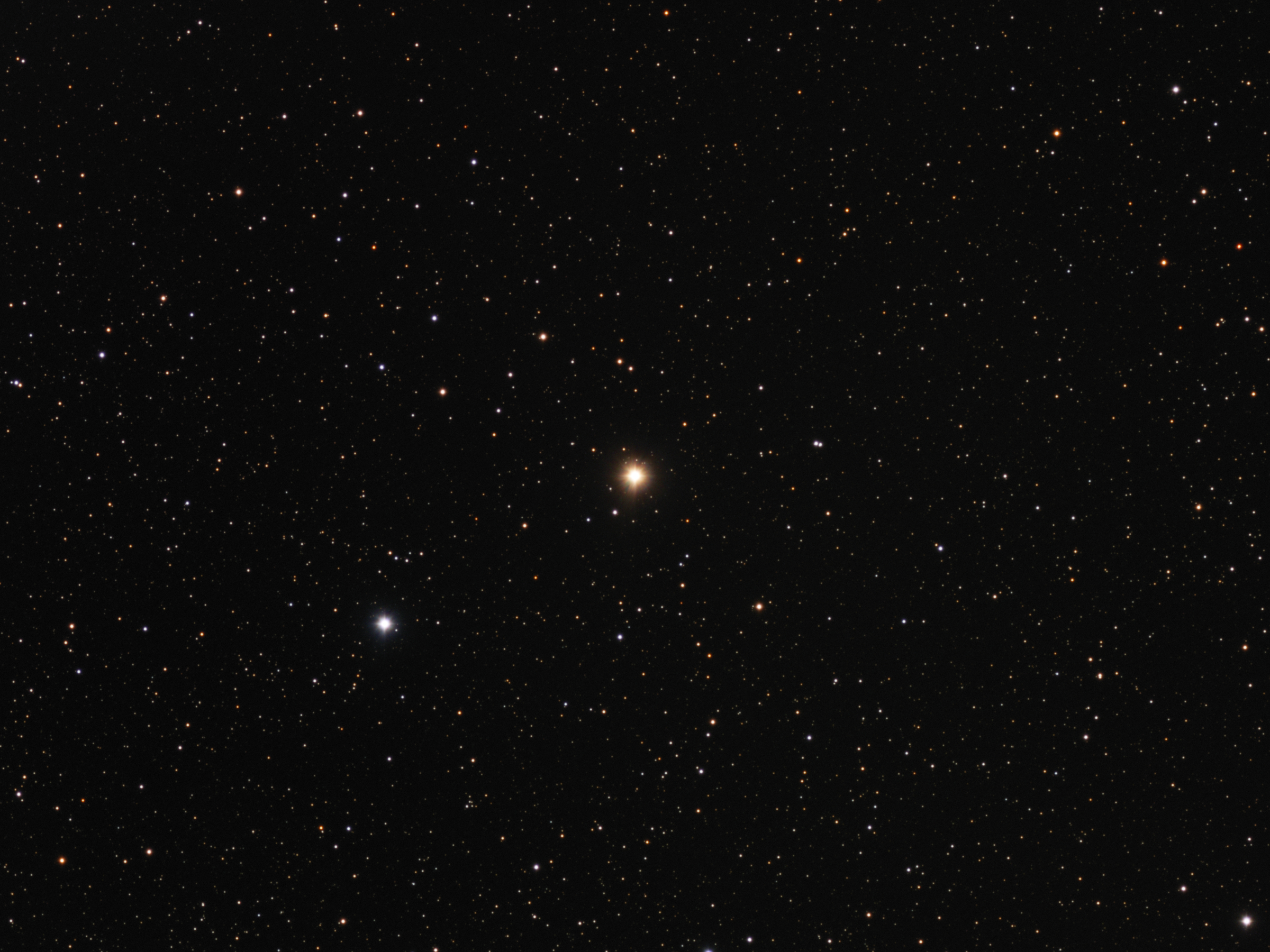
ρ Cassiopeiae in optical light, with V373 Cas to lower left

Due to Rho Cassiopeiae's large distance and inhomogeneous surface, distance measurements using the parallax technique failed to get a precise value. The 2007 Hipparcos parallax is poorly constrained and results in a distance of 12,000±8,700 ly, while the Gaia DR2 parallax from 2018 give a distance of 3,300+1,300
−650 ly, suggesting luminosity and radius values of 129,000 L_{☉} and 250 R_{☉}. However, underlying astrometric indicators such as the excess astrometric noise suggest this distance is unreliable. The Gaia Data Release 3 parallax published in 2020 is both negative and smaller than the statistical margin of error, as well as still being associated with large astrometric noise.

Indirect methods therefore have been used to estimate its distance. For example, assuming membership to the OB association Cassiopeia OB5 would suggest a distance of 9,200+720
−620 ly, although a later study questioned membership to this association and found no evidence for membership to any other stellar group. A more recent estimate from 2019 suggest 8,200±1,600 ly based on spectroscopic and radial velocity observations during the 2000 eruption, while an estimate from 1991 using its extinction-corrected apparent magnitude and an assumed absolute magnitude typical for a hypergiant give 10,000±1,600 ly. Using the mean value of distances of stars with similar proper motion to Rho Cassiopeiae and reliable Gaia parallaxes yields 9,200+340
−330 ly. The star's radial velocity is consistent with a distance between 8,200 and 10,000 ly.

== Properties ==
Rho Cassiopeiae is one of the most luminous yellow stars known. It is close to the Eddington luminosity limit and normally loses mass at around 10^{−6} M_{☉}/a, hundreds of millions of times the rate of the solar wind. Much of the time it has a temperature over 7,000 K, a radius around 400 R_{☉}, and pulsates irregularly producing small changes in brightness. Approximately every 50 years it undergoes a larger outburst and blows off a substantial fraction of its atmosphere, causing the temperature to drop around 1,500 K and the brightness to drop by up to 1.5 magnitudes. In 2000–2001 the mass loss rate jumped to 5×10^{−2} M_{☉}/a, ejecting in total approximately 3% of a solar mass or 10,000 Earth masses. The luminosity remains roughly constant during the outbursts at half a million L_{☉}, but the radiation output shifts towards the infrared.

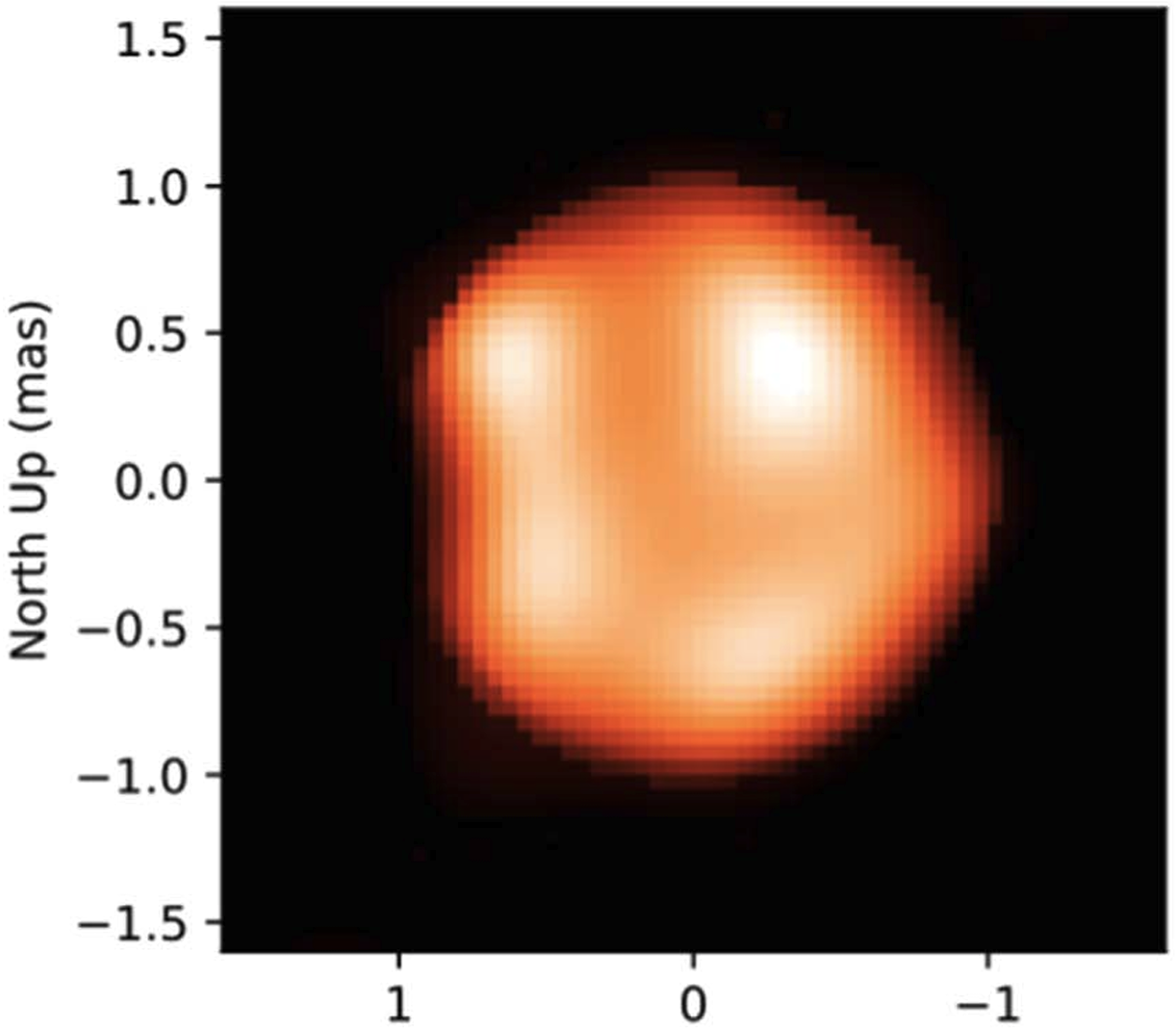
Rho Cassiopeiae as observed by the CHARA array

In 2023, Rho Cassiopeiae was imaged through interferometry at the CHARA array. The star was observed at the H and K near-infrared wavelengths, and the results gave an angular diameter of 2.08±0.01 milliarcseconds. At the adopted distance of 2,500 to 3,100 parsecs (8,200 to 10,000 light-years), this gives a physical radius of 564±67 or 700±112 R_{☉}, comparable to Betelgeuse. Large convection cells (hot spots) and cold spots also had been observed, as well as the star's extended circumstellar envelope. The distance was refined to 2,800 parsecs (9,100 ly) in 2026, yielding a radius of 634±24 R_{☉}.

Surface abundances of most heavy elements on Rho Cas are enhanced relative to the Sun, but carbon and oxygen are depleted. This is expected for a massive star where hydrogen fusion takes place predominantly via the CNO cycle. In addition to the expected helium and nitrogen convected to the surface, sodium is strongly enhanced, indicating that the star had experienced a dredge-up while in a red supergiant stage. Therefore, it is expected that Rho Cas is now evolving towards hotter temperatures. It is currently core helium burning through the triple alpha process.

The relatively low mass and high luminosity of a post-red supergiant star is a source of instability, pushing it close to the Eddington Limit. However, yellow hypergiants lie in a temperature range where opacity variations in zones of partial ionisation of hydrogen and helium cause pulsations, similar to the cause of Cepheid variable pulsations. In hypergiants, these pulsations are generally irregular and small, but combined with the overall instability of the outer layers of the star they can result in larger outbursts. This may all be part of an evolutionary trend towards hotter temperatures through the loss of the star's atmosphere.

== Evolution ==
From left to right: the Sun (small, faint dot on the far left representing 1 R_{☉} – too small to be visible in this thumbnail), the Pistol Star, Rho Cassiopeiae, Betelgeuse, and VY Canis Majoris. The orbits of Jupiter (♃ 5.23 AU) and Neptune (♆ 30.11 AU) are included for comparison.

Rho Cassiopeiae is a yellow hypergiant, a rare type of luminous supergiant with an effective temperature between that of the cooler red supergiants and the hotter luminous blue variables and blue supergiants. They are unstable and undergo pulsations and eruptions that cause the temperature and brightness of the star to vary over timescales of months to a few years.

Yellow hypergiants are post-red supergiant stars, evolving rapidly to hotter temperatures as they shed their outer layers. They occupy a region of the H-R diagram somewhat cooler than a boundary at about 8,200 K, typically 4,000 K to 8,000 K. To hotter temperatures, there is a region known as the yellow evolutionary void, up to about 12,000 K, where very few stars are observed.

Calculations show that a luminous star with a temperature in the range of 8,200 K to 12,000 K is extremely unstable as the atmosphere becomes opaque at certain wavelengths. As a yellow hypergiant reaches these temperatures, its atmosphere expands dramatically and the star cools again. The brightness increases as the temperature increases, then drops to a minimum as the star cools. Rho Cassiopeiae has undergone these "bounces" several times during the 20th and 21st centuries, notably in 1946, 1986, 2000, and 2013. The outbursts occur every 10 to 20 years or so, but vary in duration and size. The 2013 outburst in particular was unusual and it is predicted that Rho Cassiopeiae is becoming stable and will be able to resume its evolution to hotter temperatures without further outbursts, although it may eventually become a luminous blue variable and undergo another type of dramatic instability. The star V509 Cassiopeiae was a similar semiregular yellow hypergiant until about 1986, but has apparently become stable and is increasing its temperature steadily; if Rho Cassiopeiae follows the same pattern, it will become stable around 2045.

== See also ==
- RW Cephei, a similar yellow hypergiant star
