= Iota Andromedae =

Star in the constellation of Andromeda

- Location of ι Andromedae (circled)

Observation data Epoch J2000 Equinox ICRS
- Constellation: Andromeda
- Right ascension: 23^{h} 38^{m} 08.200^{s}
- Declination: +43° 16′ 05.06″
- Apparent magnitude (V): +4.29

Characteristics
- Evolutionary stage: main sequence
- Spectral type: B8 V
- U−B color index: –0.29
- B−V color index: –0.11
- Variable type: constant

Astrometry
Radial velocity (R_{v})	–0.5 km/s
Proper motion (μ)	RA: +27.163 mas/yr Dec.: −1.246 mas/yr
Parallax (π)	6.4313±0.1375 mas
Distance	510 ± 10 ly (155 ± 3 pc)
Absolute magnitude (M_{V})	−1.63

Details
Mass	3.1 M_{☉} 3.98±0.06 M_{☉}
Radius	4.6 R_{☉}
Luminosity	638 L_{☉}
Surface gravity (log g)	3.35 cgs
Temperature	12,620 K
Metallicity [Fe/H]	−0.19±0.14 dex
Rotational velocity (v sin i)	70 km/s
Age	116 Myr

Other designations
- Rasalnaqa, ι And, 17 And, BD+42°4720, FK5 891, HD 222173, HIP 116631, HR 8965, SAO 53216, PPM 64473

Database references
SIMBAD	data

Iota Andromedae, also named Rasalnaqa /ræsəlnɑːkɑː/, is a single star in the northern constellation of Andromeda. It has the Flamsteed designation 17 Andromedae, while Iota Andromedae is the Bayer designation as Latinized from ι Andromedae. This object is visible to the naked eye at night as a faint, blue-white hued star with an apparent visual magnitude of +4.29. Based upon parallax measurements, it is located approximately 510 light years distant from the Sun.

This object is a B-type main-sequence star with a stellar classification of B8 V. It is among the least variable stars observed during the Hipparcos mission. The star is 116 million years old with 3.1 times the mass of the Sun and is spinning with a projected rotational velocity of 70 km/s. It is radiating 638 times the luminosity of the Sun from its photosphere at an effective temperature of 12,620 K. The star is somewhat metal-poor, although the abundance of helium is close to solar. The latter excludes it from membership among the class of peculiar stars. Iota Andromedae is a debris disk candidate, showing an infrared excess at a wavelength of 18 μm.

== Name ==
In the catalogue of stars in the Calendarium of Al Achsasi al Mouakket, this star was designated Keff al-Salsalat (كف المسلسلة - kaf al-musalsala), which was translated into Latin as Manus Catenata, meaning hand of the chained woman (i.e. Andromeda). This name originally referred to a group of three stars – ι Andromedae, κ Andromedae, and λ Andromedae – also known in traditional Arabic astronomy as Ra’s al-Nāqa, the head of the she-camel. The IAU Working Group on Star Names approved the name Rasalnaqa for ι Andromedae on 8 May 2025 and it is now so entered in the IAU Catalog of Star Names; the name Kaffalmusalsala was given to κ Andromedae.

In Chinese, 螣蛇 (Téng Shé), meaning Flying Serpent, refers to an asterism consisting of ι Andromedae, α Lacertae, 4 Lacertae, π^{2} Cygni, π^{1} Cygni, HD 206267, ε Cephei, β Lacertae, σ Cassiopeiae, ρ Cassiopeiae, τ Cassiopeiae, AR Cassiopeiae, 9 Lacertae, 3 Andromedae, 7 Andromedae, 8 Andromedae, λ Andromedae, κ Andromedae and ψ Andromedae. Consequently, the Chinese name for ι Andromedae itself is 螣蛇二十二 (Téng Shé èrshíèr, English: the Twenty Second Star of Flying Serpent).
