= Alpha Lacertae =

Star in the constellation Lacerta

α Lacertae
- Location of α Lacertae (circled in red)

Observation data Epoch J2000.0 Equinox J2000.0 (ICRS)
- Constellation: Lacerta
- Right ascension: 22^{h} 31^{m} 17.50131^{s}
- Declination: +50° 16′ 56.9682″
- Apparent magnitude (V): 3.76

Characteristics
- Evolutionary stage: main sequence
- Spectral type: A1 V
- U−B color index: 0.00
- B−V color index: 0.031±0.003
- R−I color index: −0.03

Astrometry
Radial velocity (R_{v})	−4.5±0.9 km/s
Proper motion (μ)	RA: 137.51 mas/yr Dec.: 17.01 mas/yr
Parallax (π)	31.79±0.12 mas
Distance	102.6 ± 0.4 ly (31.5 ± 0.1 pc)
Absolute magnitude (M_{V})	1.27

Details
Mass	2.194 M_{☉}
Radius	2.14±0.07 R_{☉}
Luminosity	27.7±0.2 L_{☉}
Surface gravity (log g)	4.27±0.14 cgs
Temperature	9,050±157 K
Rotation	0.7085 d
Rotational velocity (v sin i)	128 km/s
Age	400 Myr

Other designations
- Stellio, α Lac, 7 Lac, BD+49°3875, FK5 848, GC 31471, HD 213558, HIP 111169, HR 8585, SAO 34542, ADS 16021 A, CCDM J22313+5017A, WDS J22139+3943

Database references
SIMBAD	data

Alpha Lacertae, also named Stellio, is a single white-hued star in the constellation of Lacerta, located 103 light-years from the Sun. It is the brightest star in Lacerta with an apparent visual magnitude of 3.76. The star is moving closer to the Earth with a heliocentric radial velocity of −4.5 km/s.

This is an ordinary A-type main-sequence star with a stellar classification of A1 V, which indicates it is generating energy through hydrogen fusion at its core. It is around 400 million years old with a relatively high rate of spin, showing a projected rotational velocity of 128 km/s. The star has 2.2 times the mass of the Sun and 2.1 times the Sun's radius. It is radiating 28 times the Sun's luminosity from its photosphere at an effective temperature of 9,050 K.

Alpha Lacertae has a visual companion, CCDM J22313+5017B, of spectral type A and apparent visual magnitude 11.8, approximately 36 arcseconds away. The companion is optical, a chance line-of-sight coincidence.

== Naming ==
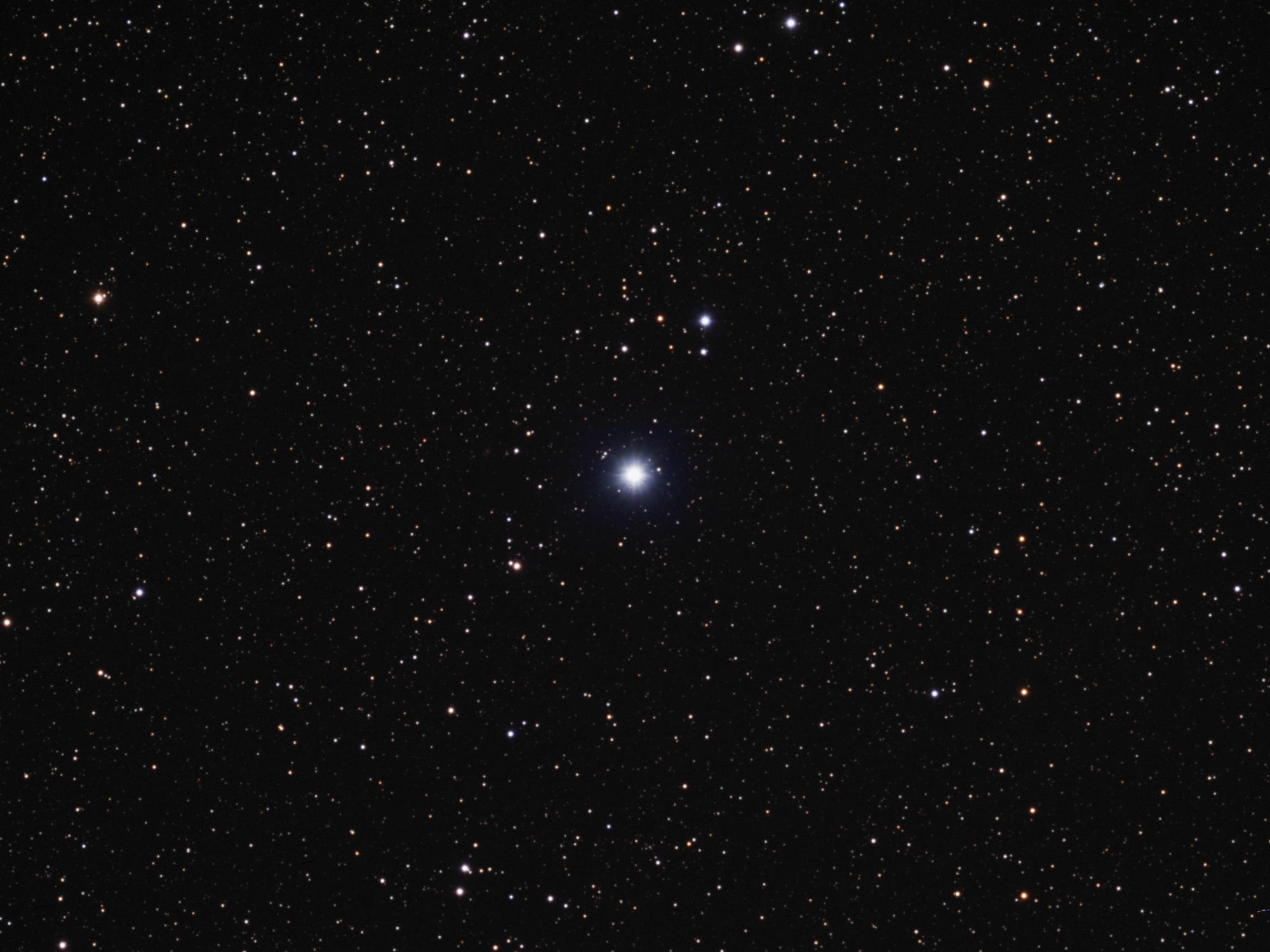
α Lacertae in optical light

Alpha Lacertae, Latinised from α Lacertae, is the Bayer designation for this star; it has the Flamsteed designation 7 Lacertae.

In Chinese astronomy, 螣蛇 (Téng Shé), meaning Flying Serpent, refers to an asterism consisting of α Lacertae, 4 Lacertae, π^{2} Cygni, π^{1} Cygni, HD 206267, ε Cephei, β Lacertae, σ Cassiopeiae, ρ Cassiopeiae, τ Cassiopeiae, AR Cassiopeiae, 9 Lacertae, 3 Andromedae, 7 Andromedae, 8 Andromedae, λ Andromedae, κ Andromedae, ι Andromedae, and ψ Andromedae. Consequently, the Chinese name for α Lacertae itself is 螣蛇一 (Téng Shé yī, English: the First Star of Flying Serpent).

The IAU Working Group on Star Names approved the name Stellio for this star on 29 August 2024 and it is now so entered in the IAU Catalog of Star Names. Stellio is an obsolete historical name for the constellation Lacerta, named after the lizard Laudakia stellio, the starred agama or stellion.
