= Lambda Andromedae =

Binary star system in the constellation of Andromeda

- Location of λ Andromedae (circled)

Observation data Epoch J2000 Equinox ICRS
- Constellation: Andromeda
- Right ascension: 23^{h} 37^{m} 33.84278^{s}
- Declination: +46° 27′ 29.3447″
- Apparent magnitude (V): 3.65 - 4.05

Characteristics
- Evolutionary stage: subgiant
- Spectral type: G8 IV
- U−B color index: +0.688
- B−V color index: +0.996
- Variable type: RS CVn

Astrometry
Radial velocity (R_{v})	+6.8 km/s
Proper motion (μ)	RA: 159.606(101) mas/yr Dec.: −421.822(97) mas/yr
Parallax (π)	38.5736±0.1179 mas
Distance	84.6 ± 0.3 ly (25.92 ± 0.08 pc)
Absolute magnitude (M_{V})	1.91

Orbit
Primary	A
Name	B
Period (P)	20.520394(41) days
Semi-major axis (a)	≥(1.8536±0.0021)×10^{6} km
Eccentricity (e)	0.0607±0.0012
Periastron epoch (T)	2459696.372±0.056 BJD
Argument of periastron (ω) (primary)	336.8±1.0°
Semi-amplitude (K_{1}) (primary)	6.5815±0.0076 km/s

Details

A
Mass	1.47±0.44 M_{☉}
Radius	7.787±0.053 R_{☉}
Luminosity	28.8 L_{☉}
Surface gravity (log g)	2.75±0.25 cgs
Temperature	4,633 K
Metallicity [Fe/H]	−0.56 dex
Rotation	54.41±0.30 days
Rotational velocity (v sin i)	7.3 km/s

B
Mass	0.086–0.115 M_{☉}

Other designations
- Udkadua, λ And, 16 Andromedae, BD+45°4283, FK5 890, GJ 9832, HD 222107, HIP 116584, HR 8961, SAO 53204, PPM 64456, LTT 16964, NLTT 57442

Database references
SIMBAD	data

Lambda Andromedae, Latinized from λ Andromedae, also named Udkadua, is a binary star system in the northern constellation of Andromeda. At an estimated distance of approximately 84.6 light-years (25.9 parsecs) from Earth, it has an apparent visual magnitude of around +3.8. This is bright enough to be seen with the naked eye. The system is drifting further away from the Sun with a radial velocity of +6.8 km/s.

== Naming ==
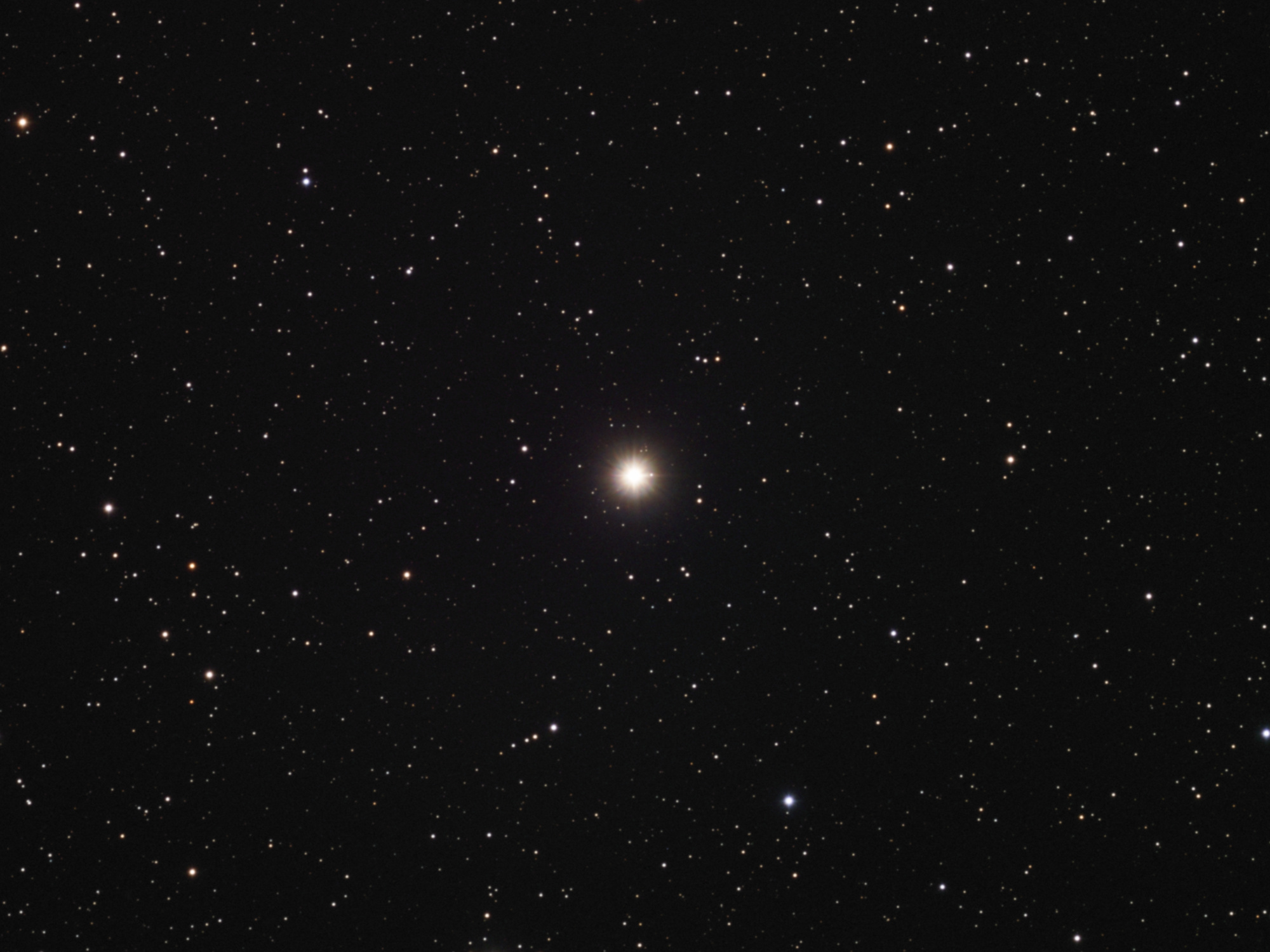
λ Andromedae in optical light

This star represented the heel of the ancient Sumerian constellation Udkadua, "the storm demon with the gaping mouth". The IAU Working Group on Star Names approved the name Udkadua for the primary component of the system. Lambda Andromedae A on 8 May 2025 and it is now so entered in the IAU Catalog of Star Names.

In traditional Arabic astronomy, the stars ι Andromedae, κ Andromedae, and λ Andromedae were known as Kaff al-Musalsala, the hand of the chained woman (i.e. Andromeda), and as Ra’s al-Nāqa, the head of the she-camel.

In Chinese, 螣蛇 (Téng Shé), meaning Flying Serpent, refers to an asterism consisting of λ Andromedae, α Lacertae, 4 Lacertae, π^{2} Cygni, π^{1} Cygni, HD 206267, ε Cephei, β Lacertae, σ Cassiopeiae, ρ Cassiopeiae, τ Cassiopeiae, AR Cassiopeiae, 9 Lacertae, 3 Andromedae, 7 Andromedae, 8 Andromedae, κ Andromedae, ι Andromedae, and ψ Andromedae. Consequently, the Chinese name for λ Andromedae itself is 螣蛇十九 (Téng Shé shíjiǔ, English: the Nineteenth Star of Flying Serpent).

== Properties ==
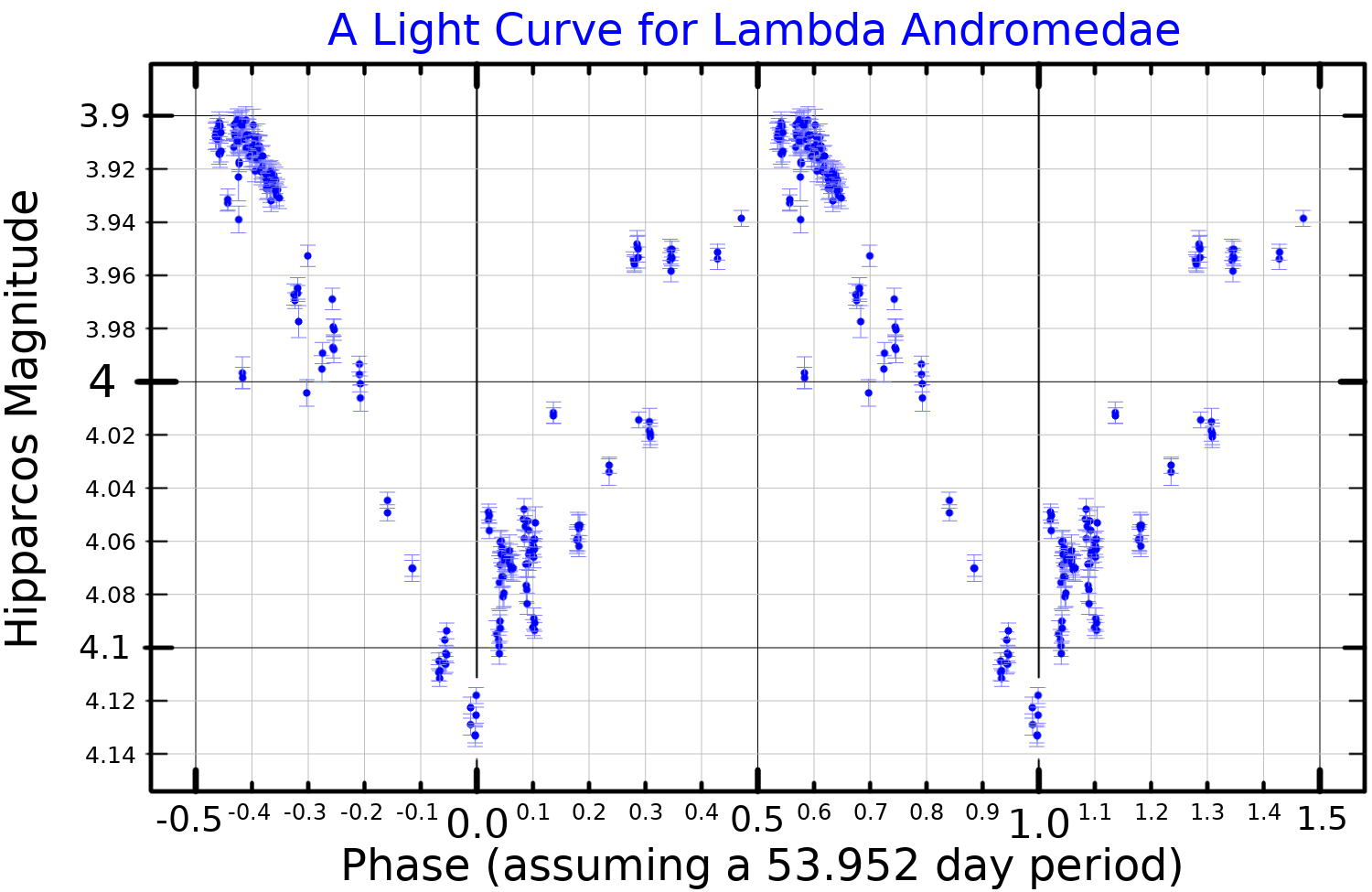
A light curve for Lambda Andromedae, plotted from Hipparcos data

Lambda Andromedae is a single-lined spectroscopic binary with an orbital period of 20.52 days. The spectrum of the primary matches a stellar classification of G8 IV, meaning that it is an evolved star that is in the subgiant stage. The mass of this star is about 50% larger than that of the Sun, but it has expanded to around seven times the Sun's radius. It is radiating over 28 times the luminosity of the Sun from its outer envelope at an effective temperature of 4,800 K, giving it the characteristic yellow hue of a G-type star.

This is an RS Canum Venaticorum variable and its brightness varies by 0.225 magnitudes, reaching a maximum of 3.70, with a period of 53.952 days. Such variability is theorized to occur because of tidal friction, which results in chromospheric activity. However, the orbit of this system is nearly circular, so the cause of this system's variability remains uncertain. The X-ray luminosity of this star, as measured by the ROSAT satellite, is 2.95×10^{30} erg/s. A magnetic field with an average strength of 21 G has been detected on this star, which is stronger than the field on the Sun. Starspots on the star's surface have been resolved with Doppler imaging.

The secondary has a very low mass of about 0.1 M_{☉}. It is most likely an L-type brown dwarf.

== Evolution ==
Many different spectral classes have been published for λ Andromedae, ranging from G6 to K1. Most sources give a luminosity class of III (giant) or IV (subgiant). Analysis of the physical properties of the star, including its temperature, luminosity, magnetic field, and stellar wind, show that it has recently experienced the first dredge-up and has begun to ascend the red giant branch although it still has a hot corona and is classified as a subgiant by some definitions.
