= Psi Andromedae =

Triple star system in the constellation Andromeda

- Location of ψ Andromedae (circled in red)

Observation data Epoch J2000 Equinox ICRS
- Constellation: Andromeda
- Right ascension: 23^{h} 46^{m} 02.04703^{s}
- Declination: +46° 25′ 12.9865″
- Apparent magnitude (V): 4.95

Characteristics
- Spectral type: G5 Ib + B9
- U−B color index: +0.83
- B−V color index: +1.085

Astrometry
Radial velocity (R_{v})	−23.62 km/s
Proper motion (μ)	RA: +8.446±0.132 mas/yr Dec.: −7.143±0.109 mas/yr
Parallax (π)	1.6352±0.1627 mas
Distance	2,000 ± 200 ly (610 ± 60 pc)
Absolute magnitude (M_{V})	–3.039

Details

ψ And A
Mass	5.4 M_{☉}
Radius	59+8 −10 R_{☉}
Luminosity	1,049±161 L_{☉}
Surface gravity (log g)	1.50 cgs
Temperature	4,276±182 K
Metallicity [Fe/H]	+0.10 dex
Age	79 Myr

B
Mass	2.6 M_{☉}
Temperature	11,000 K

Other designations
- 20 And, BD+45°4321, FK5 1622, HD 223047, HIP 117221, HR 9003, SAO 53355, PPM 64635

Database references
SIMBAD	data

Psi Andromedae (ψ And, ψ Andromedae) is the Bayer designation for a triple star system in the northern constellation of Andromeda. The combined apparent visual magnitude of this system is 4.95. Based upon parallax measurements, is roughly 2,000 light-years (610 parsecs) from Earth.

The primary component has a stellar classification of G5 Ib, which matches the spectrum of an evolved supergiant star. It forms a pair with a star of type B9 with an unknown luminosity class separated by 0.28 arcseconds. A third component has a separation of 0.14 arcseconds. Details of the orbital arrangement remain uncertain.

== Naming ==
In Chinese, 螣蛇 (Téng Shé), meaning Flying Serpent, refers to an asterism consisting of ψ Andromedae, α Lacertae, 4 Lacertae, π^{2} Cygni, π^{1} Cygni, HD 206267, ε Cephei, β Lacertae, σ Cassiopeiae, ρ Cassiopeiae, τ Cassiopeiae, AR Cassiopeiae, 9 Lacertae, 3 Andromedae, 7 Andromedae, 8 Andromedae, λ Andromedae, κ Andromedae and ι Andromedae,. Consequently, the Chinese name for ψ Andromedae itself is 螣蛇二十 (Téng Shé èrshí, English: the Twentieth of Flying Serpent).
