= Honores Friderici =

Former constellation

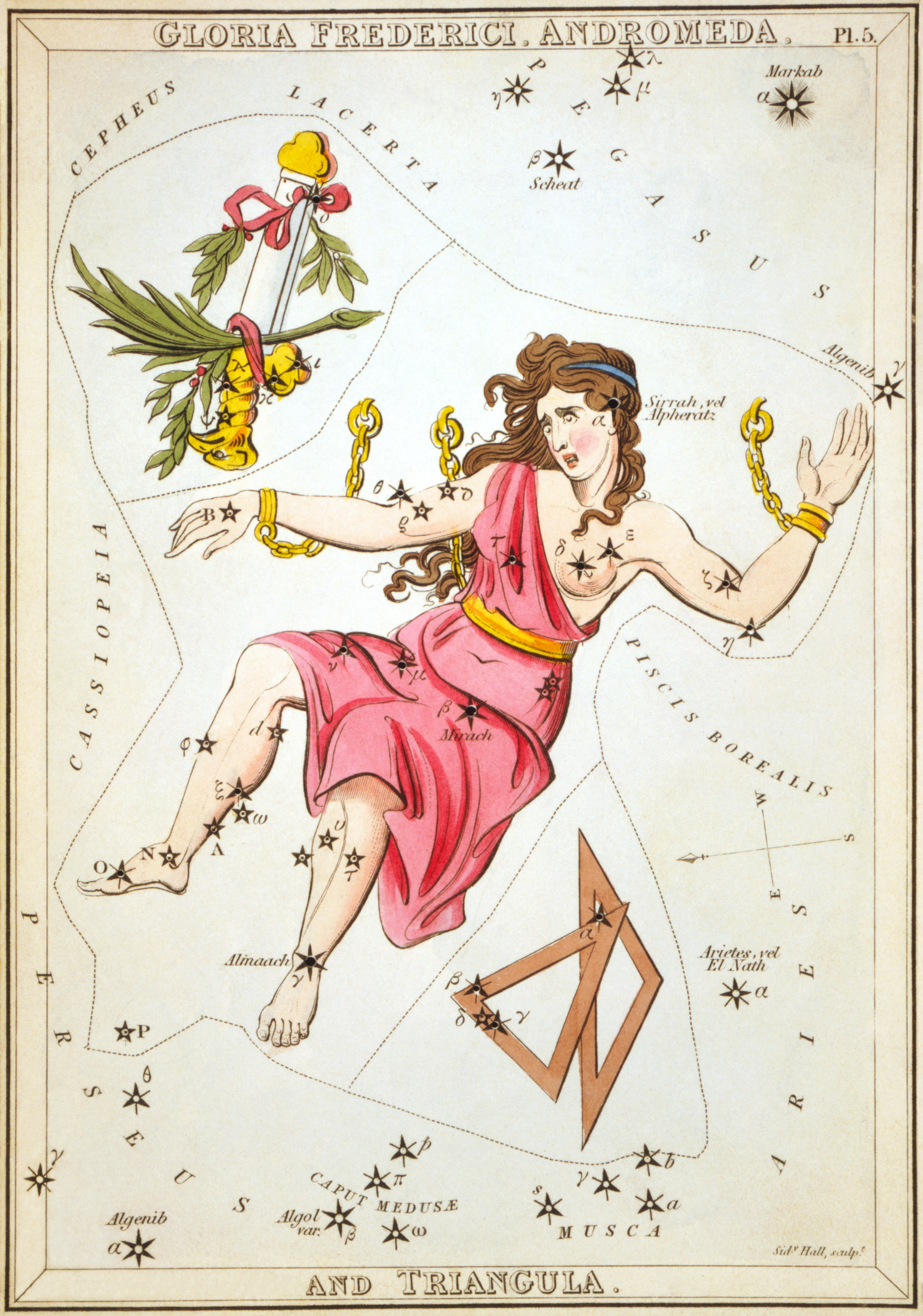
Gloria Frederici is seen above and to the left of Andromeda in this 1825 star chart from Urania's Mirror.

Honores Friderici or Frederici Honores, (Latin, "the Honours, or Regalia, of Frederic") also called Gloria Frederica or Frederici ("Glory of Frederick") was a constellation created by Johann Bode in 1787 to honor Frederick the Great, the king of Prussia who had died in the previous year. It was between the constellations of Cepheus, Andromeda, Cassiopeia and Cygnus. Its most important stars were Iota (Rasalnaqa), Kappa (Kaffalmusalsala), Lambda (Udkadua), Omicron (Alfarasalkamil), and Psi Andromedae. The constellation is no longer in use.

== History ==
Johann Bode first introduced the constellation in his 1787 publication Astronomisches Jahrbuch, calling it Friedrichs Ehre, to honour Frederick the Great, who had just died the previous year. He latinized its name to Honores Friderici in his 1801 work Uranographia. He illustrated it as a crown above a sword, pen and olive branch, based on his perception of Frederick as a "hero, sage and peacemaker".

The constellation was taken up by some cartographers and not by others, but was increasingly ignored from the latter half of the 19th century, and is no longer in use. Most of it lies within the borders of modern Andromeda, with parts in Cassiopeia, Cepheus and Pegasus.

== Stars ==
Bode incorporated 76 stars into his new constellation, made up of 26 from Andromeda, 9 from Lacerta, 6 from Cepheus, 5 from Pegasus, and 3 from Cassiopeia. The three brightest stars—all of magnitude 4—that lay within its borders are Omicron, Lambda, and Kappa Andromedae. With an apparent magnitude of 3.62, Omicron Andromedae is a multiple star system, the brightest star of which is a blue-white subgiant of spectral type B6 IIIpe and its visible companion a white star of spectral type A2. Each appears to have a close companion, making it a quadruple system. It is approximately 690 light-years from Earth. Lambda Andromedae is a yellow subgiant star of spectral type G8IVk around 1.3 times as massive as the Sun that has used up its core hydrogen and expanded to around 7 times its diameter. It is a spectroscopic binary composed of two stars close together orbiting each other every 20 days, the brighter component a RS Canum Venaticorum variable. Kappa Andromedae is a blue white star of apparent magnitude 4.14, that was found to have a substellar companion by direct imaging in 2012. Initially thought to be a planet, it is now thought to be a brown dwarf around 22 times as massive as Jupiter.

Iota and Psi Andromedae make up the asterism. Shining at magnitude 4.29, Iota Andromedae is a blue-white main sequence star of spectral type B8V around 500 light-years distant from Earth.

The IAU Working Group on Star Names approved the name Honores for the star 7 Andromedae in 2025, after the obsolete constellation. This star was chosen for the name because it was in the feather part of the constellation, in reference to the proverb "the feather is mightier than the sword". The constellation's brightest star, Omicron Andromedae, was named Alfarasalkamil after an older Arabic constellation.

== See also ==
- Former constellations
