= Selamta Family Project =

The Selamta Family Project is an all-volunteer, 501(c)(3) non-profit organization providing secure homes, medical intervention and education opportunities to orphaned and abandoned children.

"Selamta, which is funded by the Human Capital Foundation, seeks to help Ethiopian orphans, especially those who have lost their parents to the AIDS pandemic. Children receive clothing, food, medical attention and school tuition at the Selamta Children’s Center before joining one of seven families, each of which hosts about eight children brought together by the organization."

== Key Partners ==
- Worldwide Orphans Foundation
- Packard Foundation
- SEEDS
- Right to Play
- Kettering Foundation
- Ethiopian Government
- Ethiopian Hospital (Bettel)
- Johns Hopkins
- Ethiopian Police
- Ethiopian Embassy
