= Kappa Andromedae b =

Astronomical object orbiting Kappa Andromedae

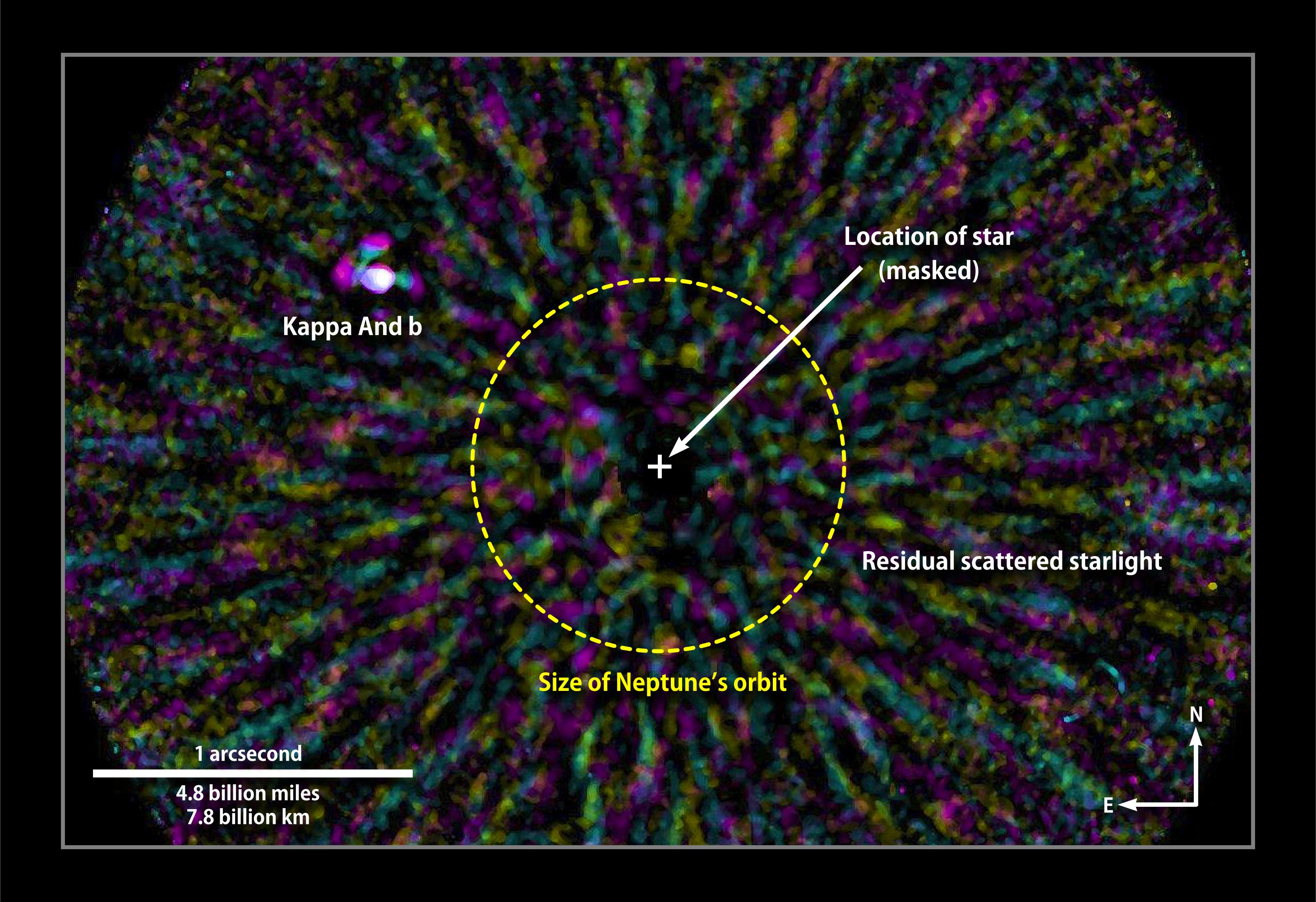
- Kappa Andromedae b is visible as the white blob in the upper left.

Orbital characteristics
- Semi-major axis: 104+30 −46AU
- Eccentricity: 0.80+0.05 −0.08
- Orbital period (sidereal): 520+450 −230 years
- Inclination: 132.0°
- Longitude of ascending node: 94.1+69.5 −7.7°
- Time of periastron: 2049.9+10.5 −8.5
- Argument of periastron: 176±24°
- Star: Kappa Andromedae

Physical characteristics
- Mean radius: 1.42±0.06 R_{J}
- Mass: 17.3±1.8 M_{J}
- Surface gravity: log g = 4.35±0.07 cgs
- Temperature: 1,791±68 K

Kappa Andromedae b is a directly imaged substellar object and likely superjovian-mass planet orbiting Kappa Andromedae, a young A0V star in the constellation Andromeda, about 170 light-years away. The companion's mass is roughly 17 times the mass of Jupiter. As early history on Kappa And b is filled with debate over whether it is an exoplanet or a brown dwarf, some scientists have broadly described it as a "super-Jupiter" object.

== Discovery ==
Kappa Andromedae b was discovered through near-infrared high-contrast imaging during the Strategic Explorations of Exoplanets and Disks with Subaru (SEEDS) survey at the Subaru Telescope, located atop Mauna Kea, Hawaii. Follow-up Subaru observations taken between January and July 2012 and covering a wider wavelength range confirmed that Kappa Andromedae is gravitationally bound (not a background star) and had infrared colors consistent with a substellar (possibly planet–mass) companion.

== Atmosphere and orbital properties ==
The low resolution near-infrared spectrum of Kappa And b, obtained by extreme adaptive optics system SCExAO with the CHARIS integral field spectrograph, is shaped by broad water and carbon monoxide absorption features. Moderate resolution Keck/OSIRIS spectroscopy resolve these lines. Based on comparisons to large libraries of spectra for other substellar objects, the companion likely has a spectral type of L0-L1: its sharp H-band (1.65 microns) shape is indicative of low surface gravity.

Empirical comparisons to well-characterized substellar objects suggest an effective temperature of 1,700–2,000 K. Atmospheric modeling incorporating longer wavelength data favors the cooler end of this temperature range, while temperatures derived from Keck/OSIRIS spectra favor higher values of 1,950–2,100 K. The atmosphere of Kappa And b is likely filled by thick cloud deck extending to low atmospheric pressures. Modelling of historical photometric data in the near-infrared and spectral data taken by the MIRI instrument aboard the James Webb Space Telescope favors a temperature of 1,791±68 K. Analysis of the companion's spectrum yields a near-solar carbon-to-oxygen ratio (C/O ~ 0.70).

Kappa Andromedae b was first imaged at a projected separation of about 55 AU; subsequent data sets recover the companion at smaller angular separations. While only a small portion of the companion's orbital phase has been covered, current limits suggest a semi-major axis of approximately 100 AU, with margin for slightly different values. Its eccentricity is fairly high, roughly 0.80. The relative radial-velocity between it and its host star is −1.4±0.9 km/s.

In 2024, Kappa Andromedae b was found to be rapidly rotating, with a rotational velocity of 38.42±0.05 km/s, which is close to 50% of its breakup velocity.

== System age and mass ==
The masses of directly imaged substellar objects (exoplanets and brown dwarfs) are usually not directly measured but are instead inferred by comparing their luminosities to predicted values for substellar evolution models. Thus, uncertainties in the system age translate into uncertainties in the object's mass. The discovery paper for Kappa Andromedae b argued that the primary's kinematics are consistent with membership in the Columba association, which would imply a system age of 20 to 50 million years and a mass of about 12.8 Jupiter masses. These results were later questioned by those who argued that the primary star's position on the Hertzsprung–Russell diagram favors a much older age of 220 ± 100 million years, provided that the star, Kappa Andromedae A, is not a fast rotator viewed pole-on. Direct measurements of the star later showed that Kappa Andromedae A is in fact a rapid rotator viewed pole-on and yield a best-estimated age of 47^{+27}_{−40} million years favoring a mass of 22+8
−9 jovian masses. A revised luminosity and detailed empirical comparisons with other substellar objects with known ages favor a mass of 13^{+12}_{−2} Jupiter masses. Comparing historical photometric data in the near-infrared and the spectral data taken by the MIRI instrument aboard the James Webb Space Telescope to the predictions of atmospheric models yield a mass of 17.3±1.8 Jupiter masses. Evolutionary models yield an age of 47±7 million years based on the retrieved surface gravity, effective temperature and radius.

== Classification and formation ==
The nature of Kappa Andromedae b has been long-debated, specifically whether it is a gas giant planet or a brown dwarf, an object massive enough to fuse deuterium but not protium. The Working Group on Extrasolar Planets of the International Astronomical Union adopted the deuterium-burning limit (set at 13 Jupiter masses) to separate planets (below this limit) and brown dwarfs (above it). However, later work has revealed many free-floating objects labeled as brown dwarfs but with inferred masses at or well below the deuterium-burning limit. Models indicate that the exact definition of the deuterium-burning further depends on the assumed metallicity of the object and the completeness of deuterium burning, ranging from 11 Jupiter masses for an extremely metal-rich object at 10% burning to over 16 Jupiter masses for a metal poor object burning 90% of its deuterium. Alternate criteria for separating planets from brown dwarfs abandon the deuterium-burning limit altogether, instead inferring an object's nature based on its mass ratio with respect to its primary and its separation.

Previous debate centered largely on the system age, since it determines inferred values for the companion mass and mass ratio with respect to its primary star. For the now-disfavored older age (220 ± 100 million years), the inferred mass of the companion would be well above the deuterium-burning limit and its mass ratio would exceed 1%, best consistent with a brown dwarf. Younger ages inferred from possible membership in the Columba association, derived from direct measurements of the star, and consistent with Kappa And b's spectral properties strongly favor masses near 13 Jupiter masses and a mass ratio below 1%. The companion's orbital plane may also be aligned with the rotation axis of the star. These lines of evidence support the classification of this object as a superjovian-mass planet.

Forming a planet in situ with Kappa And b's properties is extremely challenging for standard core accretion models for jovian planet formation. Instead, planet formation by gravitational instability may be a viable mechanism for this companion. The companion's derived carbon to oxygen ratio, thought to be a diagnostic of the object's accretion environment, and the primary's subsolar metallicity may be evidence that Kappa And b formed through a rapid formation process, like gravitational instability.
