= V373 Cassiopeiae =

Star system in the constellation Cassiopeia

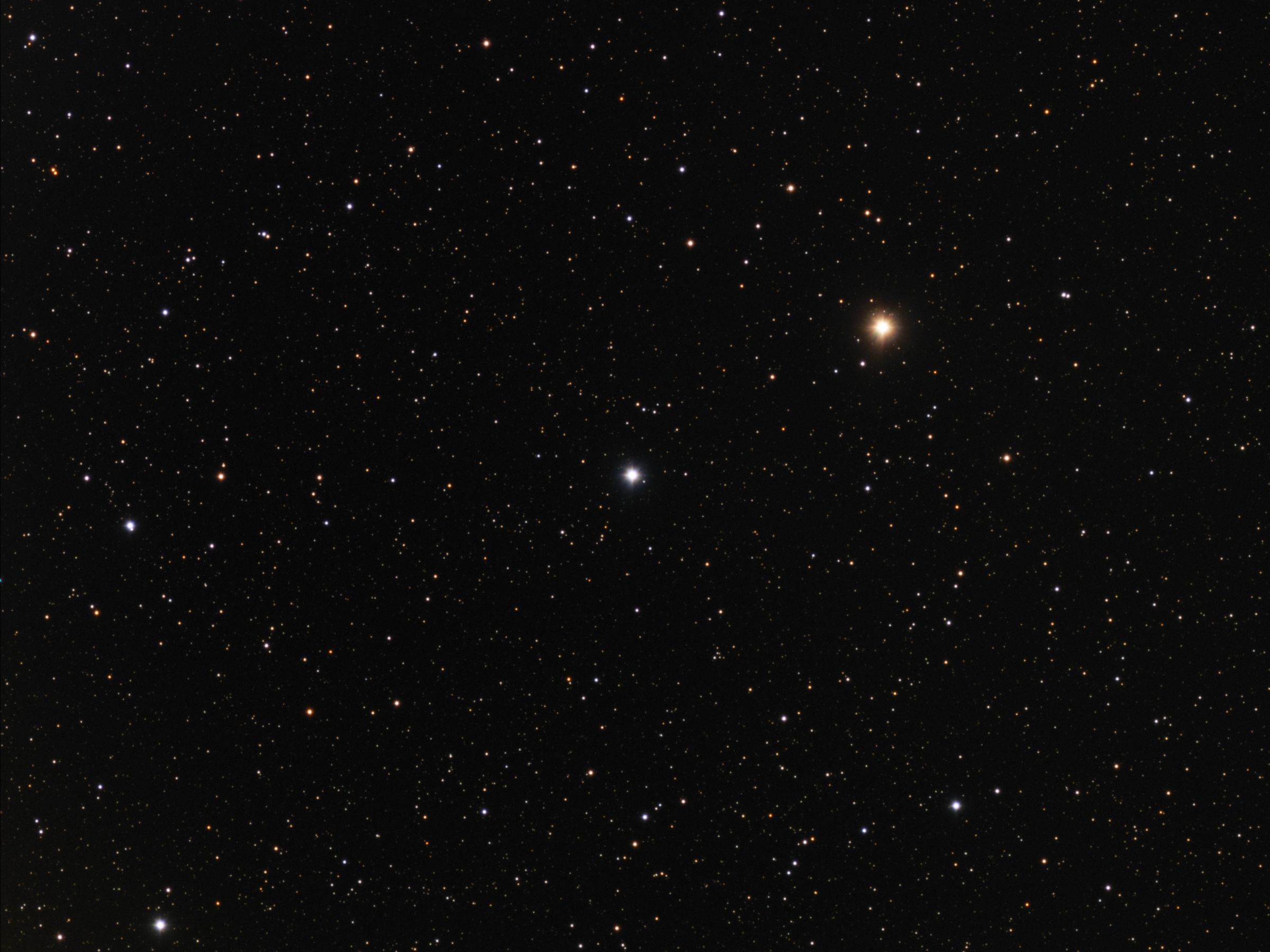
- V373 Cassiopeiae (center) in optical light. The bright yellow star to the upper right of V373 Cas is ρ Cas.

Observation data Epoch J2000 Equinox ICRS
- Constellation: Cassiopeia
- Right ascension: 23^{h} 55^{m} 33.83870^{s}
- Declination: +57° 24′ 43.8074″
- Apparent magnitude (V): 5.96 - 6.06

Characteristics
- Spectral type: B0.5II + B4III/V
- B−V color index: 0.155±0.005
- Variable type: Eclipsing?

Astrometry
Radial velocity (R_{v})	−25.5±0.9 km/s
Proper motion (μ)	RA: −4.060 mas/yr Dec.: −0.020 mas/yr
Parallax (π)	0.5019±0.0330 mas
Distance	6,500 ± 400 ly (2,000 ± 100 pc)

Orbit
Period (P)	13.41921 days
Eccentricity (e)	0.126±0.019
Periastron epoch (T)	2,420,801.98 JD
Argument of periastron (ω) (secondary)	16±8°
Semi-amplitude (K_{1}) (primary)	106.7±2.7 km/s
Semi-amplitude (K_{2}) (secondary)	144.6±2.6 km/s

Details

A
Mass	18.6±2.4 M_{☉}
Surface gravity (log g)	3.0±0.2 cgs
Temperature	23,200±600 K
Rotational velocity (v sin i)	130±10 km/s
Age	7–8 Myr

B
Mass	14.2±1.9 M_{☉}
Surface gravity (log g)	3.5±0.2 cgs
Temperature	26,800±1,500 K
Rotational velocity (v sin i)	60±5 km/s

Other designations
- V373 Cas, BD+56°3115, GC 33184, HD 224151, HIP 117957, HR 9052, SAO 35899

Database references
SIMBAD	data

V373 Cas is a binary star system in the northern constellation Cassiopeia. It is a suspected eclipsing binary with an apparent visual magnitude that decreases from a baseline of 6.03 down to 6.13. The system is located at a distance of approximately 6,500 light years from the Sun, but is drifting closer with a radial velocity of around −25.5 km/s. It is faintly visible to the naked eye under very good observing conditions.

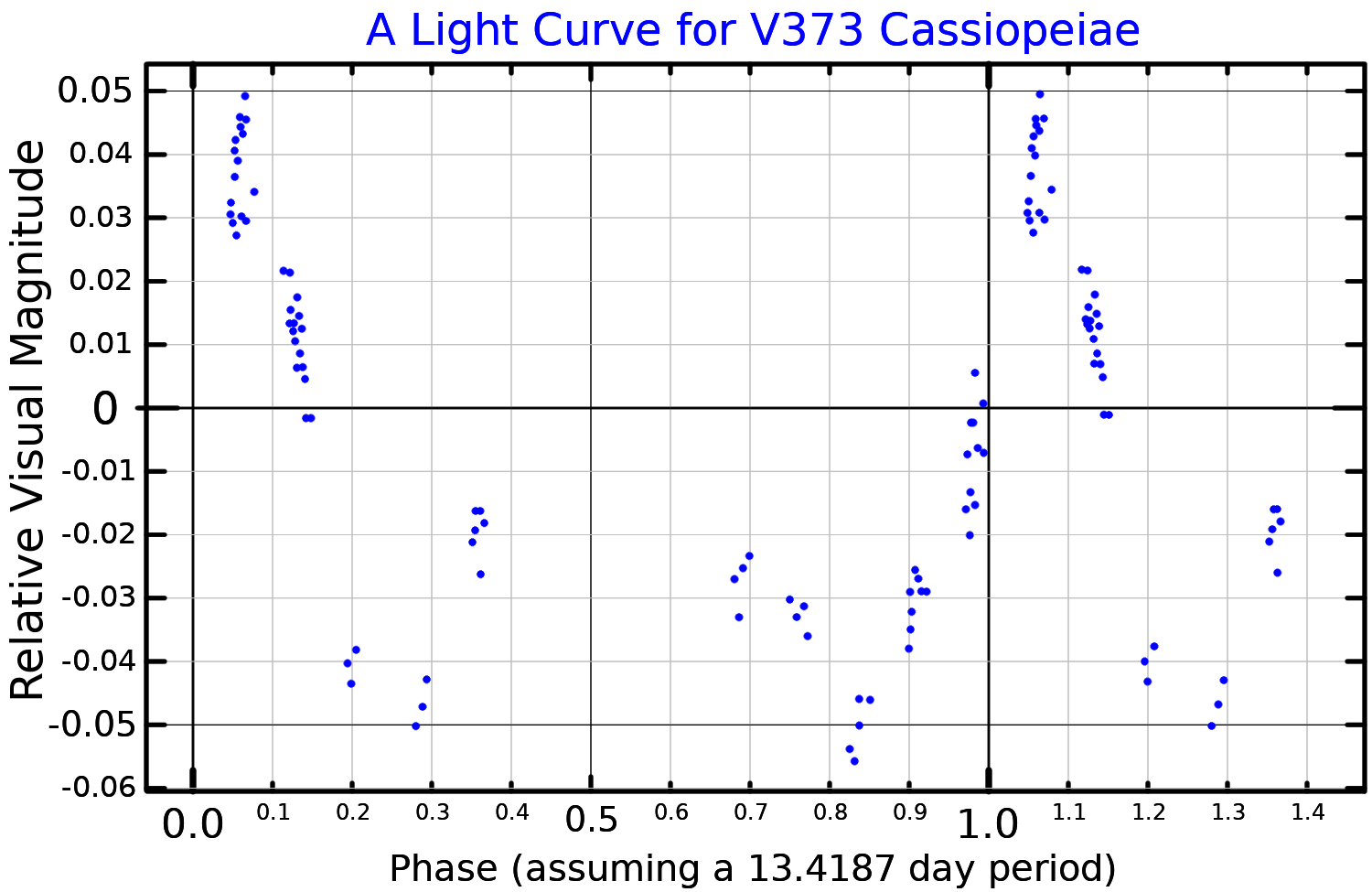
A visual band light curve for V373 Cassiopeiae, adapted from Lynds (1959)

The binary nature of this system was announced in 1912 by Walter S. Adams. It is a double-lined spectroscopic binary with an orbital period of 13.4 days and an eccentricity of 0.13. The system was found to be variable in 1958 by C. Roger Lynds, and the variability cycle was shown to be related to the orbital period. It has been described as a heartbeat star rather than an eclipsing system. This is a type of pulsating star where the pulsations are induced by the tidal attraction of a close companion.

V373 Cas is composed of two hot blue-white giant stars that have exhausted their core hydrogen and expanded off the main sequence. Lyubimkov and colleagues analysed spectral and radial velocity to calculate that the stars were ~19 and ~15 times as massive as the Sun and the age of the system is around 7-8 million years old. The primary component is the more evolved and now comes close to filling its Roche lobe when it is at periastron.
