= Strategic Explorations of Exoplanets and Disks with Subaru =

Long survey that imaged exoplanets and protoplanetary disks

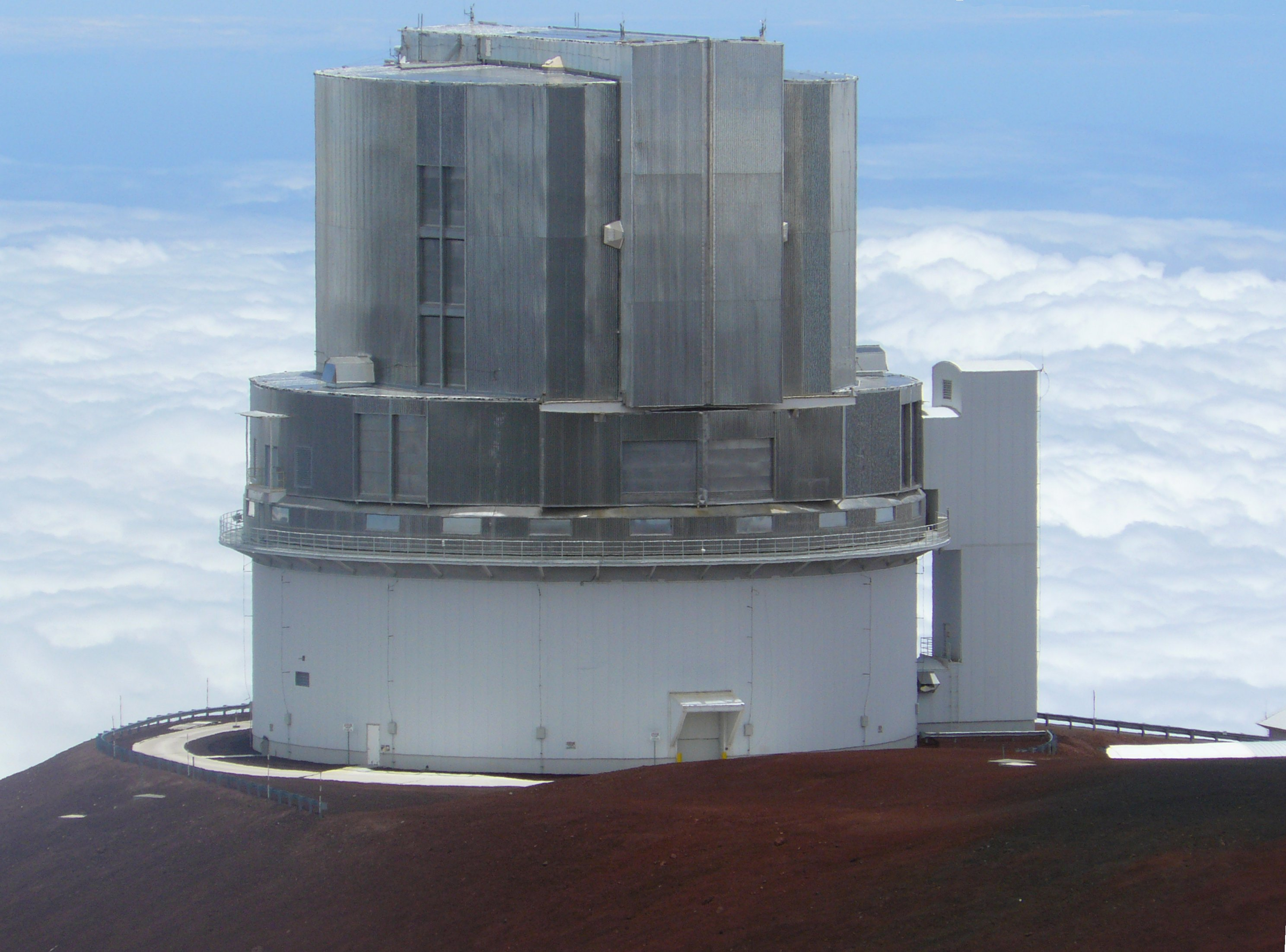
The Subaru Telescope at the Mauna Kea Observatory on Hawaii.

Strategic Explorations of Exoplanets and Disks with Subaru (SEEDS) is a multi-year survey that used the Subaru Telescope on Mauna Kea, Hawaii in an effort to directly image extrasolar planets and protoplanetary/debris disks around hundreds of nearby stars. SEEDS is a Japanese-led international project. It consists of some 120 researchers from a number of institutions in Japan, the U.S. and the EU. The survey's headquarters is at the National Astronomical Observatory of Japan (NAOJ) and led by Principal Investigator Motohide Tamura. The goals of the survey are to address the following key issues in the study of extrasolar planets and disks: the detection and census of exoplanets in the regions around solar-mass and massive stars; the evolution of protoplanetary disks and debris disks; and the link between exoplanets and circumstellar disks.

== Observations and Results ==
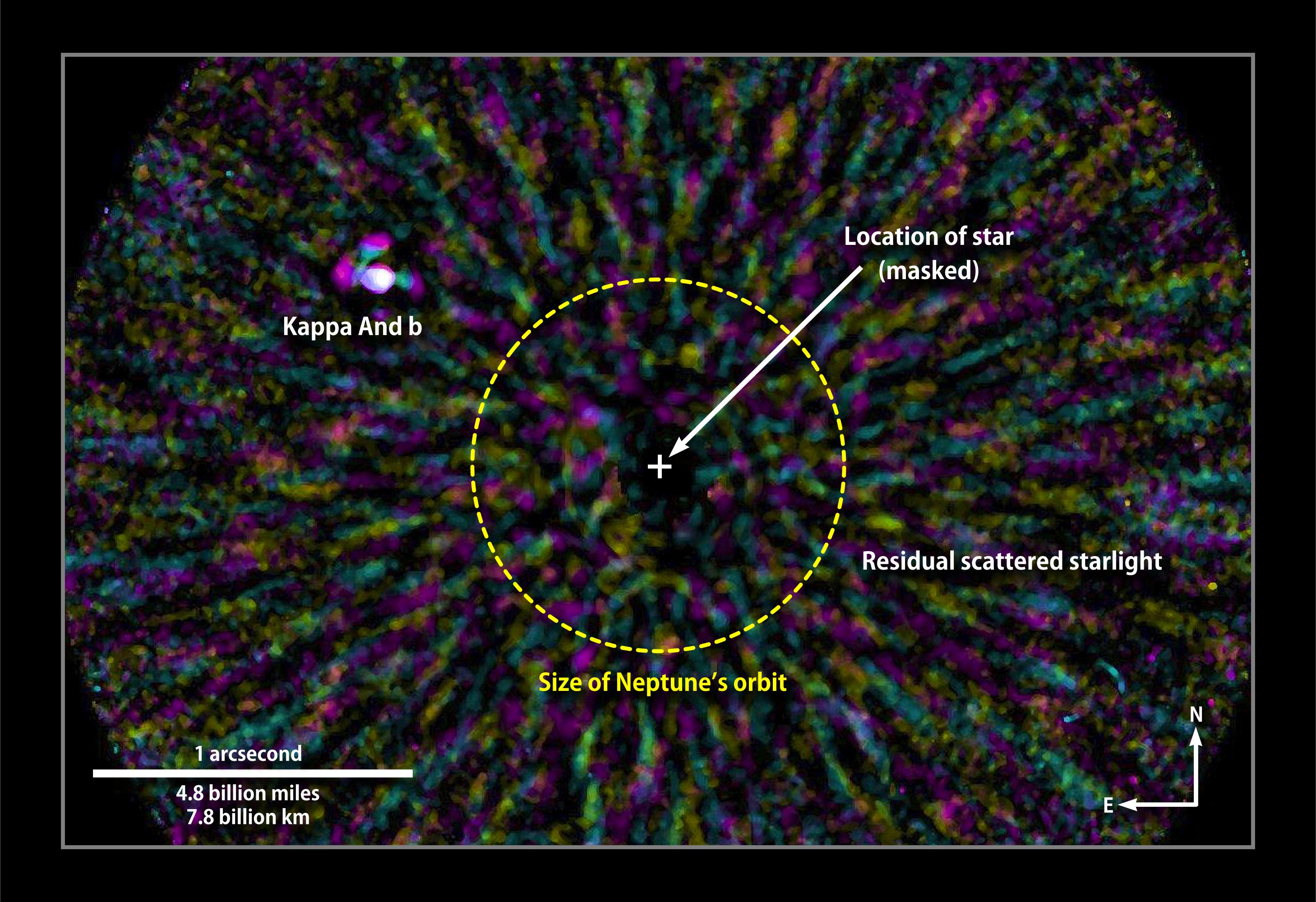
Kappa Andromedae b, the Super-Jupiter exoplanet of 12.8 Jupiter masses discovered as part of the SEEDS survey

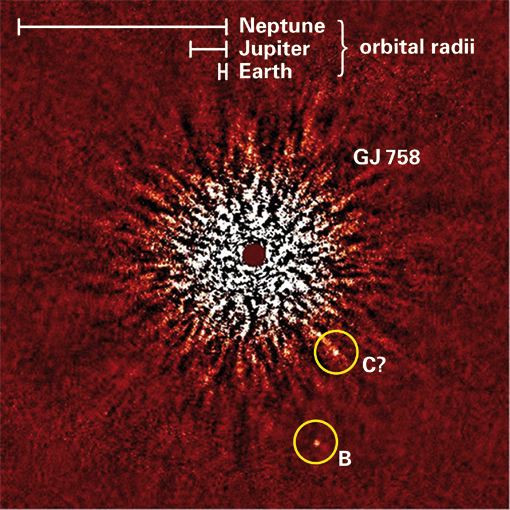
The confirmed brown dwarf GJ 758 B and the candidate GJ 758 C, which was later found to be a background star

The direct imaging survey was carried out with a suite of high-contrast instrumentation at the large Subaru 8.2 m telescope, including a second-generation adaptive optics (AO) system with 188 actuators (AO188) and a dedicated coronagraph instrument called HiCIAO. Observations began in late October 2009 and were completed in early January 2015, having observed roughly 500 nearby stars (including duplicates). The survey was conducted in the H-band (1.65 micron) and once a planet/companion candidate was detected, it was also observed at other near-infrared wavelengths.

SEEDS has reported four candidate planets to date. The first one is GJ 758 b, with a mass around 10–30 Jupiter masses and orbiting around a Sun-like star. The projected distance from the central star to the companion is 29 AU at a distance of around 52 light years. The second discovery was of a very faint planet orbiting a Sun-like star named GJ 504. The projected distance from the central star is 44 AU at a distance of 59 light years. The central star itself is bright, visible to the naked-eye (V ~ 5 mag), but the planet is very dim, 17–20 mag at infrared wavelengths. The planet mass is estimated to be only 3–4.5 Jupiter masses, estimated from its luminosity and age. It is one of the lightest-mass planets ever imaged.

The survey also discovered a likely superjovian-mass planet named Kappa Andromedae b, orbiting a young B-type star 2.8 times the mass of Sun. HD 100546 b was confirmed as a planet with a disk system around a very young star as part of the SEEDS survey. SEEDS has also reported the detection of three brown dwarfs in the Pleiades cluster as part of the Open Cluster category survey and several stellar or substellar companions around planetary systems, from the radial velocity detection. SEEDS has detected interesting fine-structures in disks around dozens of young stars. These disks exhibit gaps, spiral arms, rings, and other structures at similar radial distances where the outer planets are imaged. These structures can be considered to be "signposts" of planets. The results obtained on disks support the need for a new planet formation model.

Additional planet and disk discoveries include:

- New high resolution imaging of the AB Aurigae system
- Detection of extended outer regions of the debris ring around HR 4796 A
- New reflected light imaging of the transitional disk gap around LkCa 15
- Explorations for outer massive bodies around the transiting planet system HAT-P-7
- Imaging discovery of the debris disk around HIP 79977
- First infrared images of the inner gap in the 2MASS J16042165-2130284 transitional disk.
- Direct imaging discovery of a large inner gap in the protoplanetary disk around PDS 70
- Discovery of spiral structures in the transitional disk around SAO 206462
- Discovery of a stellar companion to the extrasolar planet system HAT-P-7
- Near-IR scattered light detection of the spiral-armed transitional disk of the star MWC 758
- Direct imaging of the UX Tau A pre-transitional disk revealing gap structures
- Scattered light imaging of the MWC 80 protoplanetary disk at a historic minimum of the near-IR excess
- High-contrast imaging discovery of architecture in the LkCa 15 transitional disk
- Submillimeter and near-infrared observation of the transitional disk around Sz 91
- First high resolution infrared images of circumstellar disk around SU Aur revealing tidal-like tails

== See also ==
- Definition of 'Extrasolar planet'
- Direct imaging of extrasolar planets
- List of extrasolar planets
- List of planet types
