= Flying serpent (asterism) =

Flying Serpent (Tengshe 螣蛇) is an asterism (name for a group of stars) in the constellation "Encampment" (Shixiu 室宿) in the Chinese constellation system. It is named after the mythological serpent, tengshe.

The Tengshe asterism was a group of "22 stars, occurring in the northern [part] of the "Encampment" (室) constellation, [representing; or comprising the figure of] the Heavenly Snake, chief of the water reptiles", according to the treatise on astronomy in the Book of Jin (Jin Shu).

Tengshe coincides with the lizard constellation Lacerta, and the northern parts of Lacerta occupy the center of Tengshe. The identification of stars in Tengshe has changed over time. Before the Tang dynasty, the main star of the asterism was V424 Lacertae, which has been named Tengshe by the IAU Working Group on Star Names. Later, Alpha Lacertae was identified as the main star of Tengshe.
