= 8 Andromedae =

Multiple star system in the constellation Andromeda

- Location of 8 Andromedae (circled)

Observation data Epoch J2000 Equinox J2000
- Constellation: Andromeda
- Right ascension: 23^{h} 17^{m} 44.64727^{s}
- Declination: +49° 00′ 55.0829″
- Apparent magnitude (V): 4.82

Characteristics
- Evolutionary stage: AGB
- Spectral type: M2.5 III Ba0.5
- B−V color index: 1.673

Astrometry
Radial velocity (R_{v})	−8.0±0.3 km/s
Proper motion (μ)	RA: +33.779 mas/yr Dec.: +6.213 mas/yr
Parallax (π)	5.6963±0.1030 mas
Distance	570 ± 10 ly (176 ± 3 pc)
Absolute magnitude (M_{V})	−1.727

Details
Radius	30 R_{☉}
Surface gravity (log g)	1.00±0.25 cgs
Temperature	3,616±22 K
Metallicity [Fe/H]	+0.04±0.08 dex
Rotational velocity (v sin i)	5.0±1.0 km/s

Other designations
- 8 And, NSV 14484, BD+48°3991, HD 219734, HIP 115022, HR 8860, SAO 52871, PPM 64030, WDS J23177+4901A

Database references
SIMBAD	data

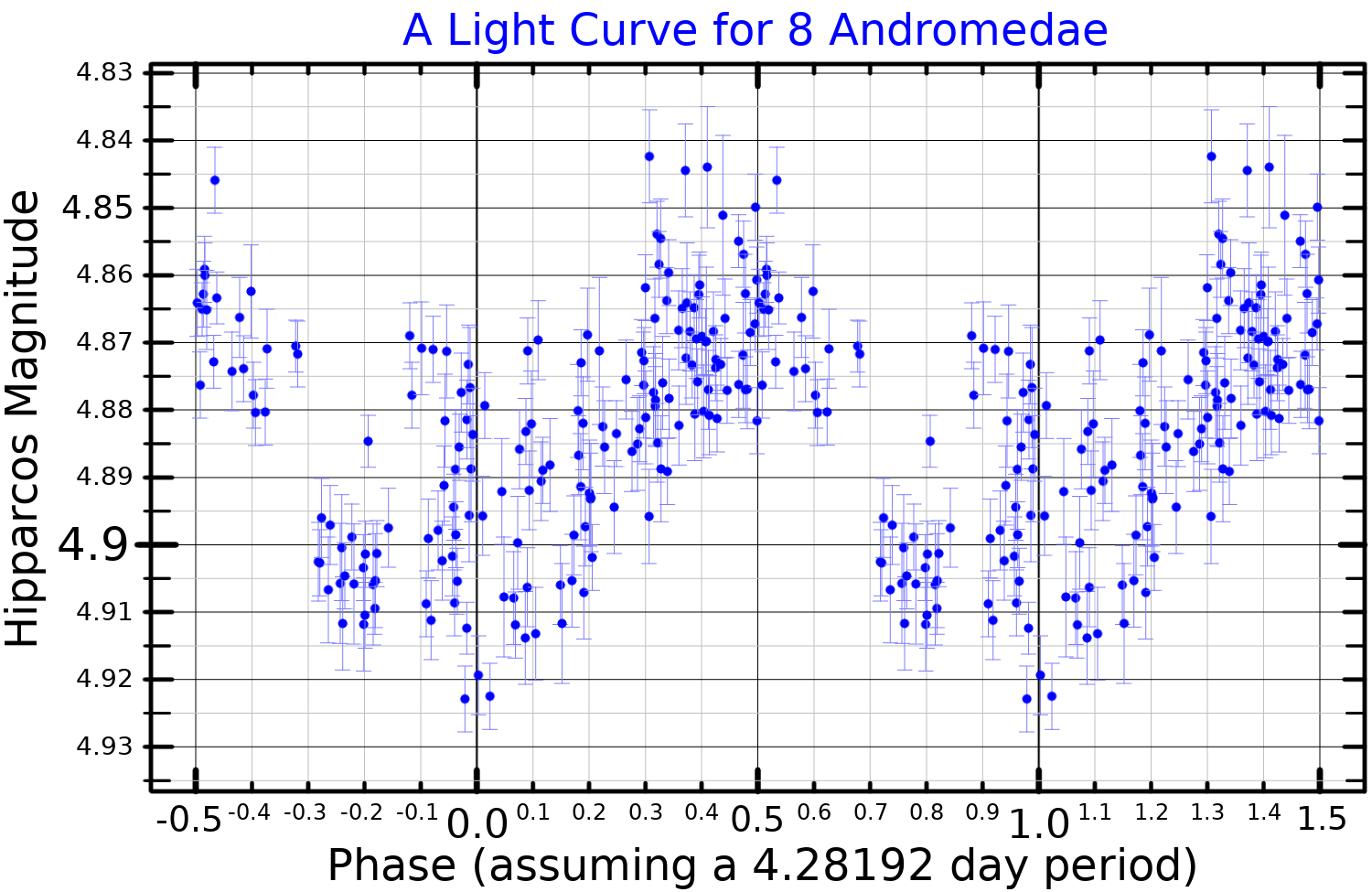
A light curve for 8 Andromedae, plotted from Hipparcos data

8 Andromedae, abbreviated 8 And, is a probable triple star system in the northern constellation of Andromeda. 8 Andromedae is the Flamsteed designation. It is visible to the naked eye with an apparent visual magnitude of 4.82. Based upon an annual parallax shift of 5.7 mas, it is located about 570 light years from the Earth. It is moving closer with a heliocentric radial velocity of −8 km/s.

The primary component is an ageing red giant star with a stellar classification of M2.5 III Ba0.5. The suffix notation indicates this is a mild barium star, which means the stellar atmosphere is enriched with s-process elements. It is either a member of a close binary system and has previously acquired these elements from a (now) white dwarf companion or else it is on the asymptotic giant branch and is generating the elements itself. This is a periodic variable of unknown type, changing in brightness with an amplitude of 0.0161 magnitude at a frequency of 0.23354 d^{−1}, or once every 4.3 days.

The third component is the magnitude 13.0 star at an angular separation of 7.8″ along a position angle of 164°, as of 2015. It has a Gaia Data Release 3 parallax of 5.7 mas and a proper motion almost identical to 8 Andromedae. A number of other faint stars within a few arc-minutes of 8 Andromedae have been listed as companions, but none are at the same distance.

Within Andromeda it is the second of a northerly chain asterism – 11 is further south-westward, with 7, 5, then 3 Andromedae in the other direction.
