= 4 Lacertae =

Star in the constellation Lacerta

- Location of 4 Lacertae (circled in red)

Observation data Epoch J2000 Equinox J2000
- Constellation: Lacerta
- Right ascension: 22^{h} 24^{m} 30.99149^{s}
- Declination: +49° 28′ 35.0106″
- Apparent magnitude (V): 4.55

Characteristics
- Evolutionary stage: Blue supergiant (blue loop)
- Spectral type: A0 Ib
- B−V color index: 0.092±0.034

Astrometry
| Radial velocity (R_{v}) | −26.0±1.7 km/s |
| Proper motion (μ) | RA: −5.274(82)‍ mas/yr Dec.: −3.303(96)‍ mas/yr |
| Parallax (π) | 1.2656±0.0891 mas |
| Distance | 2,600 ± 200 ly (790 ± 60 pc) |
| Absolute magnitude (M_{V}) | −4.42 |

Details
| Mass | 19+13 −8 M_{☉} |
| Radius | 36 ± 5 (Note: Applying the Stefan–Boltzmann law with a nominal solar effective temperature of 5,772 K: $$\sqrt{\biggl(\frac{5,772}{11,000}\biggr)^4 \cdot 10^{4.23}} = 36\ R_\odot$$.) R_{☉} |
| Luminosity | 17,000+3,000 −2,500 L_{☉} |
| Surface gravity (log g) | 2.18 cgs |
| Temperature | 11,000±600 K |
| Metallicity [Fe/H] | 0.28±0.04 dex |
| Rotational velocity (v sin i) | 28±3 km/s |
| Age | 25.1±2.5 Myr |

Other designations
- 4 Lac, BD+48°3715, HD 212593, HIP 110609, HR 8541, SAO 51970, 2MASS J22243097+4928351

Database references
| SIMBAD | data |

4 Lacertae is a single blue supergiant star in the northern constellation Lacerta, located about 2,600 light years away. This object visible to the naked eye as a white-hued star with an apparent visual magnitude of 4.55. It is moving closer to the Earth with a heliocentric radial velocity of −26 km/s. This star is a suspected member of the Lac OB1 association.

This blue supergiant star has a stellar classification of A0 Ib. The surface abundances show evidence of material that has been processed via the CNO cycle at the core. It has ten times the mass of the Sun and has expanded to about 36 times the Sun's radius. The star is around 25 million years old and is spinning with a projected rotational velocity of 28 km/s. It is believed to be a blue loop star that has already spent time as a red supergiant after fusing the hydrogen within its core.
