= 9 Lacertae =

Star in the constellation Lacerta

- Location of 9 Lacertae (circled in red)

Observation data Epoch J2000 Equinox J2000
- Constellation: Lacerta
- Right ascension: 22^{h} 37^{m} 22.41727^{s}
- Declination: +51° 32′ 42.4383″
- Apparent magnitude (V): 4.64

Characteristics
- Evolutionary stage: main sequence
- Spectral type: A9VkA7mA6
- B−V color index: 0.254±0.006

Astrometry
Radial velocity (R_{v})	+10.1±1.5 km/s
Proper motion (μ)	RA: −51.83 mas/yr Dec.: −103.80 mas/yr
Parallax (π)	19.00±0.19 mas
Distance	172 ± 2 ly (52.6 ± 0.5 pc)
Absolute magnitude (M_{V})	1.03

Details
Mass	1.71 M_{☉}
Radius	3.28 R_{☉}
Luminosity	30 L_{☉}
Surface gravity (log g)	3.64 cgs
Temperature	7,464 K
Metallicity [Fe/H]	−0.20 dex
Rotational velocity (v sin i)	105 km/s
Age	513 Myr

Other designations
- 9 Lac, BD+50°3770, HD 214454, HIP 111674, HR 8613, SAO 34628

Database references
SIMBAD	data

9 Lacertae is a single star in the northern constellation Lacerta, located 172 light years away from Sun. It is visible to the naked eye as a faint, white-hued star with an apparent visual magnitude of 4.64. This object is moving further from the Earth with a heliocentric radial velocity of +10 km/s.

This is an A-type main-sequence star with a stellar classification of A9VkA7mA6. This notation indicates it has the Hydrogen lines of an A9 star, the Calcium K line of an A7 star, and the metal lines of an A6. It is 513 million years old with a high projected rotational velocity of 105 km/s. The star has 1.7 times the mass of the Sun and about 3.3 times the Sun's radius. It is radiating 30 times the Sun's luminosity from its photosphere at an effective temperature of 7464 K.
