= HD 206267 =

Star in the constellation Cepheus

- HD 206627 is the brightest star in the centre of the nebula IC 1396

Observation data Epoch J2000 Equinox ICRS
- Constellation: Cepheus
- Right ascension: 21^{h} 38^{m} 57.61881^{s}
- Declination: +57° 29′ 20.5399″
- Apparent magnitude (V): 5.70

Characteristics
- Spectral type: O6V((f)) + O9V
- U−B color index: −0.72
- B−V color index: +0.22

Astrometry
Radial velocity (R_{v})	−7.8 km/s
Proper motion (μ)	RA: −1.25 mas/yr Dec.: −4.58 mas/yr
Parallax (π)	1.65±0.63 mas
Distance	approx. 2,000 ly (approx. 600 pc)
Absolute magnitude (M_{V})	+4.65

Orbit
Primary	Aa1 (or Aa)
Secondary	Aa2 (or Ab)
Period (P)	3.71 days
Eccentricity (e)	0.131
Semi-amplitude (K_{1}) (primary)	186.1 km/s
Semi-amplitude (K_{2}) (secondary)	295.5 km/s

Orbit
Primary	Aa (or Aab)
Secondary	Ab (or Ac)
Period (P)	143.6 yr
Semi-major axis (a)	0.1″

Details

Aa1 (or Aa)
Mass	27.8 M_{☉}
Radius	11.7 R_{☉}
Luminosity	347,000 L_{☉}
Surface gravity (log g)	3.75 cgs
Temperature	41,000 K

Aa2 (or Ab)
Mass	17.7 M_{☉}
Radius	5.9 R_{☉}
Luminosity	50,119 L_{☉}
Surface gravity (log g)	4.14 cgs
Temperature	35,500 K
Age	1.3±1.1 Myr

Ab (or Ac)
Mass	10.0 M_{☉}

Other designations
- BD+56 2617, FK5 813, HD 206267, HIP 106886, HR 8281.

Database references
SIMBAD	data

HD 206267 is a hierarchical triple star system in the northern circumpolar constellation of Cepheus. Two of the members form a spectroscopic binary that orbit each other with a period of 3.7 days, while a third member lies further away—it is unclear whether this third member is gravitationally bound to the pair. The system is emitting a stellar wind that reaches an exceptional velocity of 3,225 km/s, among the highest measured for stars of this type.

This stellar system lies in the nebula IC 1396. All three components are massive stars, and the intense ultraviolet radiation they give off ionizes the gas of IC 1396, and causes compression denser globules of the nebula, leading to star formation. The stellar wind produced by the stars is strong enough to strip nearby stars of their protoplanetary disks.

The system is a member of the Cepheus OB2 stellar association, which notably includes evolved blue and red supergiants such as Nu Cephei, Mu Cephei, and VV Cephei. In particular, it is surrounded by a loose cluster of stars, Trumpler 37 (also known as the Misty Clover Cluster), including a 13th-magnitude star at 1.8″ and a 7th-magnitude star 12″ away. The cluster may contain over a thousand stars in total.
