= 3 Andromedae =

Star in the constellation Andromeda

- Location of 3 Andromedae (circled)

Observation data Epoch J2000 Equinox ICRS
- Constellation: Andromeda
- Right ascension: 23^{h} 04^{m} 10.98269^{s}
- Declination: +50° 03′ 07.5255″
- Apparent magnitude (V): 4.64

Characteristics
- Evolutionary stage: red clump
- Spectral type: K0 IIIb
- B−V color index: 1.058±0.003

Astrometry
Radial velocity (R_{v})	−34.87±0.12 km/s
Proper motion (μ)	RA: 165.837 mas/yr Dec.: 167.716 mas/yr
Parallax (π)	17.2629±0.0918 mas
Distance	189 ± 1 ly (57.9 ± 0.3 pc)
Absolute magnitude (M_{V})	0.97

Details
Mass	1.71 M_{☉}
Radius	10 R_{☉}
Luminosity	49 L_{☉}
Surface gravity (log g)	2.61±0.11 cgs
Temperature	4,668±45 K
Metallicity [Fe/H]	−0.08 dex
Rotational velocity (v sin i)	1.0 km/s
Age	2.27 Gyr

Other designations
- 3 And, BD+49°4028, HD 218031, HIP 113919, HR 8780, SAO 52649, PPM 41448, LTT 16772

Database references
SIMBAD	data

3 Andromedae, abbreviated 3 And, is a single star in the northern constellation of Andromeda. 3 Andromedae is the Flamsteed designation. It is visible to the naked eye with an apparent visual magnitude of 4.64. The distance to this star, as determined from an annual parallax shift of 17.3 mas, is 181 light years. It is moving closer to the Earth with a heliocentric radial velocity of −35 km/s, and has a relatively large proper motion, traversing the celestial sphere at 0.236″·yr^{−1}.

Photo of the 3 And star.

This is an evolved giant star with a stellar classification of K0 IIIb, where the 'b' suffix indicated a lower luminosity giant. It is a red clump star, which means it is generating energy through helium fusion at its core. This star has an estimated 1.7 times the mass of the Sun (M_{☉}), and, at the age of 2.3 billion years, has expanded to 10 times the Sun's radius (R_{☉}). It is radiating 49 times the Sun's luminosity from its enlarged photosphere at an effective temperature of 4,668 K.
