= Lists of constellations =

Presents lists of articles relating to the topic

The following lists of constellations are available:

- IAU designated constellations – current, or "modern", constellations
- IAU designated constellations by area – constellations ranked by area
- IAU designated constellations by geographical visibility – constellations listed by the latitudes from which they can be seen
- Former constellations
- Biblical constellations - biblical constellations made by Julius Schiller
- Constellations listed by Johannes Hevelius
- Constellations listed by Lacaille
- Constellations listed by Petrus Plancius
- Constellations listed by Ptolemy
- Chinese constellations – traditional Chinese astronomy constellations
- Inuit constellations – traditional Inuit astronomy constellations

== See also ==
- Lists of astronomical objects
- Asterism (astronomy)
