= Cosmographia =

Cosmographia (Latin, from Greek κόσμος, "world, universe", and γραφή, "representation") may refer to:

== Written works ==
- Cosmographia, an alternative name for Ptolemy's Geographia
- Cosmographia, a late antique or early medieval geographical work by Julius Honorius
- Cosmographia, an early medieval geographical work feigned to record the travels of one Aethicus Ister
- Ravenna Cosmography, a seventh- or eighth-century work by an anonymous of Ravenna
- Cosmographia (Bernardus Silvestris), a twelfth-century allegory by Bernardus Silvestris
- De mundi creatione, a twelfth-century cosmographic poem by Gerald of Wales that may contain part or all of his otherwise-lost Cosmographia
- Cosmographia, a fifteenth-century work by the German geographer Nicolaus Germanus
- Cosmographia, an alternative title of Petrus Apianus' sixteenth-century Cosmographicus liber
- Cosmographia (Sebastian Münster), a sixteenth-century work by the German geographer Sebastian Münster
- Cosmographia, a sixteenth-century work by the Portuguese geographer Bartolomeu Velho
- Cosmographia, a sixteenth-century treatise by the Italian Francesco Maurolico
- Cosmographia Blaviana, an alternative name for Joan Blaeu's Atlas Maior

== Maps ==
- Universalis Cosmographia, a sixteenth-century map by Martin Waldseemüller, the first to feature the name "America"

== See also ==
- Cosmography
- Cosmogram
- Cosmographiae Introductio, a 1507 geographical work by Martin Waldseemüller
