= Interstellar =

Interstellar or Interstella may refer to:

== Space ==
- Interstellar space
  - Interstellar medium
- Interstellar travel
- Interstellar communication
- Interstellar probe
  - Interstellar Probe (spacecraft) (ISP), a NASA probe proposed in 2018 for launch in the 2030s.
  - Interstellar Express (IHP), Chinese probes proposed in 2019 for launch in 2024.

== Art, entertainment, and media ==
=== Books ===
- Interstellar: The Search for Extraterrestrial Life and Our Future in the Stars
- Interstellarum Deep Sky Atlas, a 2014 star atlas

=== Films and soundtracks ===
- Interstella 5555: The 5tory of the 5ecret 5tar 5ystem, a 2003 animated film set to Daft Punk's album Discovery
- Interstellar (film), a 2014 science fiction film directed by Christopher Nolan
  - Interstellar (soundtrack), the soundtrack to the 2014 film Interstellar

=== Music ===
==== Groups ====
- Intastella, a band in the second wave of the Manchester music scene
- Interstellar (band), a Canadian rock band

==== Albums ====
- Interstellar (album), an album by Frankie Rose
- Interstellar Space, John Coltrane album
- Interstellar: The String Quartet Tribute to Interpol, an album by Vitamin String Quartet

==== Songs ====
- "Interstellar", a 2020 song by Au5, featuring Danyka Nadeau
- "Interstellar", a track from the album Folk by Ultramarine

== Organizations ==
- Interstellar Technologies, Japanese company

== See also ==
- Intergalactic (disambiguation)
- Interplanetary (disambiguation)
