= UGC 11919 =

Galaxy in the constellation Lacerta

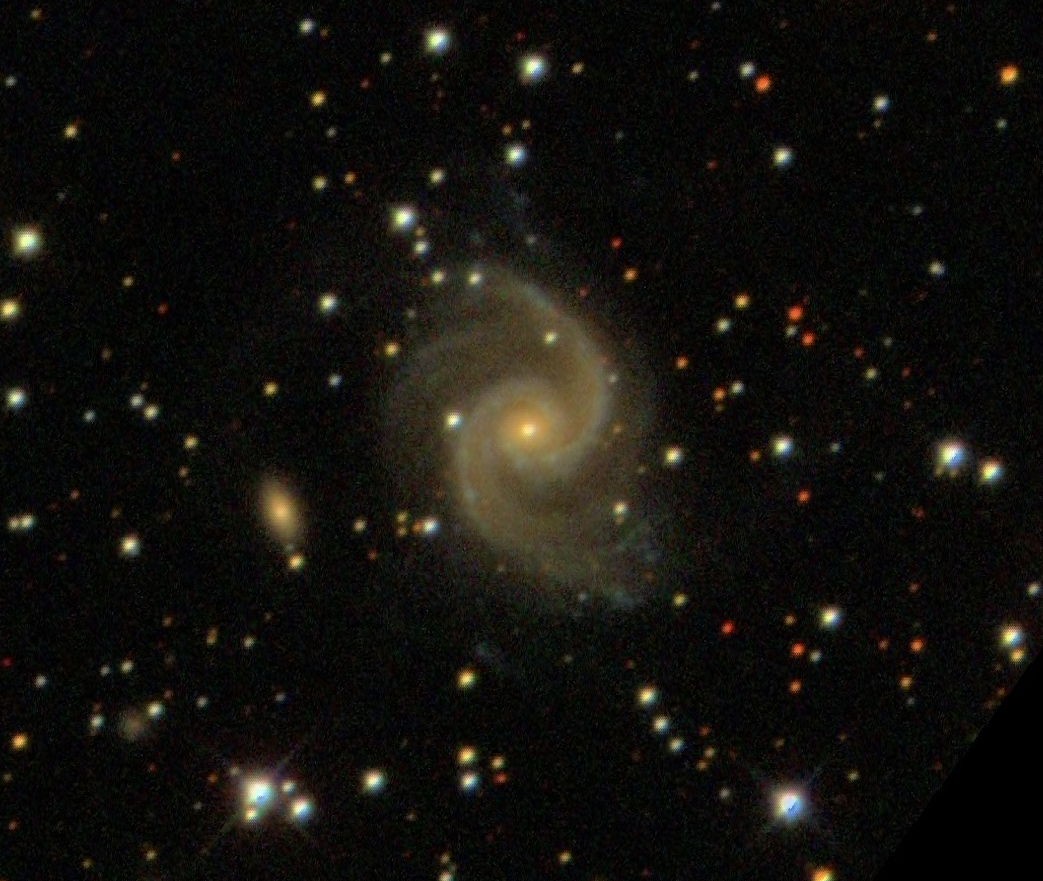
- SDSS image of UGC 11919.

Observation data (J2000 epoch)
- Constellation: Lacerta
- Right ascension: 22^{h} 08^{m} 10.54^{s}
- Declination: +41° 10′ 38.43″
- Redshift: 0.017852
- Heliocentric radial velocity: 5352 ± 5 km/s
- Distance: 268.3 ± 18.8 Mly (82.25 ± 5.76 Mpc)
- Apparent magnitude (V): 13.26

Characteristics
- Type: SABbc HII
- Size: ~111,000 ly (33.9 kpc) (estimated)

Other designations
- 2MASX J22081056+4110383, CGCG 530-010, IRAS 22060+4055, PGC 68110, MCG +07-45-014

UGC 11919 is an intermediate spiral galaxy located in the constellation of Lacerta. The redshift of the galaxy is (z) 0.017 and it was first discovered by astronomers in 1998. It also has been categorized as an unusual spiral galaxy based on observations.

== Description ==
UGC 11919 is an unusual spiral galaxy with a low dynamical mass to light ratio. When observed, its own stellar velocity dispersion is shown to display a depression feature that possibly hints its nuclear stellar disk is suggested as kinetically decoupled. Evidence also found the galaxy also has presence of spiral arms based on residual imaging and a H I disk feature that suggests as an end result of gravitational interactions. Two companions are found from the galaxy with their velocity differences being 355 and 252 kilometers per seconds respectively.

A study published in 2015, has found the galaxy has a nuclear disk component with low amount of metallicity. This is likely caused through an accretion of a neighboring satellite galaxy of low mass, which is subsequently by star formation. On the other hand, the stellar bulge feature shows the highest metallicity rate. The estimated age of the bulge and nuclear disk is around 4.2 and 2.3 billion years while the disk feature is 2.6 billion years.
