= NGC 7243 =

Open cluster in the constellation Lacerta

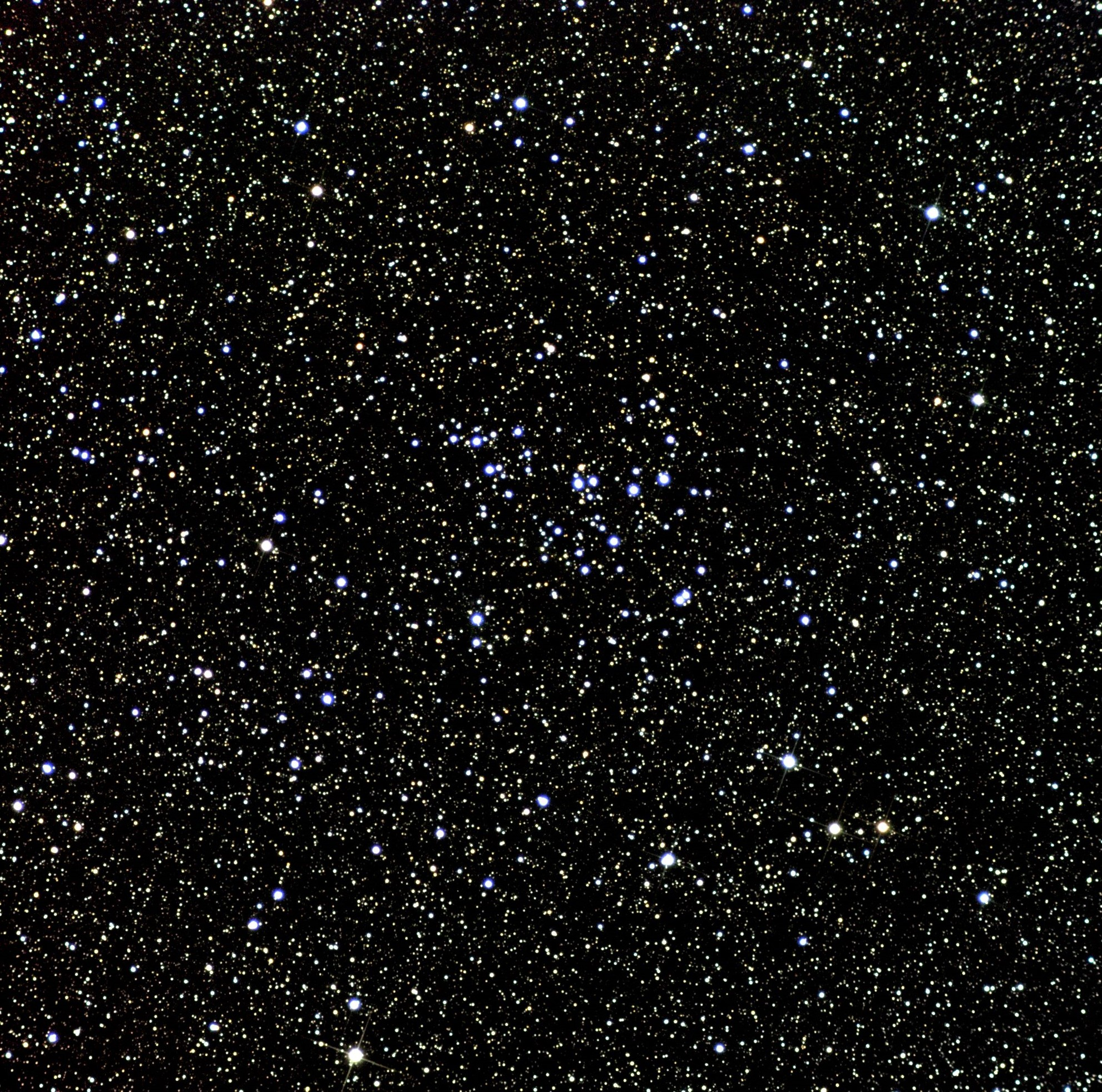
- NGC 7243

Observation data (J2000.0 epoch)
- Right ascension: 22^{h} 15^{m} 16.0^{s}
- Declination: +49° 50′ 07″
- Distance: 2,864 ly (878.0 pc)
- Apparent magnitude (V): +6.4
- Apparent dimensions (V): 30.6″

Physical characteristics
- Mass: 348 to 522 M_{☉}
- Estimated age: (2.5±0.5)×10^{8} years
- Other designations: Caldwell 16, Cr 448

Associations
- Constellation: Lacerta

NGC 7243 is an open cluster of stars in the northern constellation of Lacerta. Alternatively, it has the designation Caldwell 16 from the Caldwell catalogue. This cluster was discovered on September 26, 1788 by German-English astronomer William Herschel. It shines at magnitude +6.4, and is located near the naked-eye stars Alpha Lacertae, 4 Lacertae, an A-class double star, and planetary nebula IC 5217. NGC 7243 lies at a distance of approximately 2,864 light-years (878.0 pc).

This cluster has a Trumpler class of II 2m, indicating moderate dispersion, average brightness, and average richness of stars. A 2003 study found a combined mass in the range of 348 to 522 M_{☉}, with 211 candidate members identified down to magnitude 15.5. The main sequence turnoff for its membership yields an age estimate of (2.5±0.5)×10^{8} years. The brightest component is magnitude 8.43, and the earliest spectral type is B5 III.

In 2016, the results of multiple observing campaigns over the span of a decade found 37 eclipsing binary star systems in the cluster, as well as 26 pulsating variables. One exoplanet transit candidate was identified, J221550.6+495611.

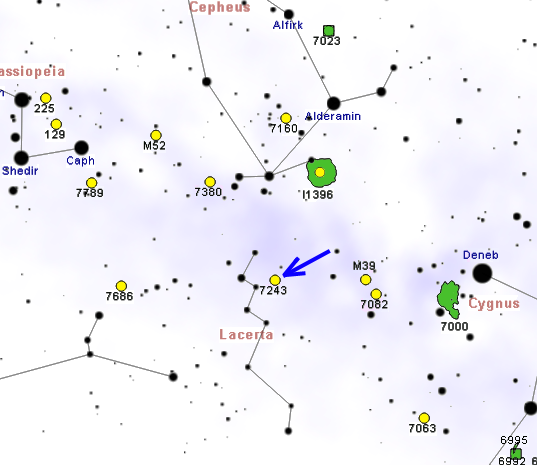
Map showing location of NGC 7243
