= Celestial cartography =

Part of astronomy concerned with mapping of stars

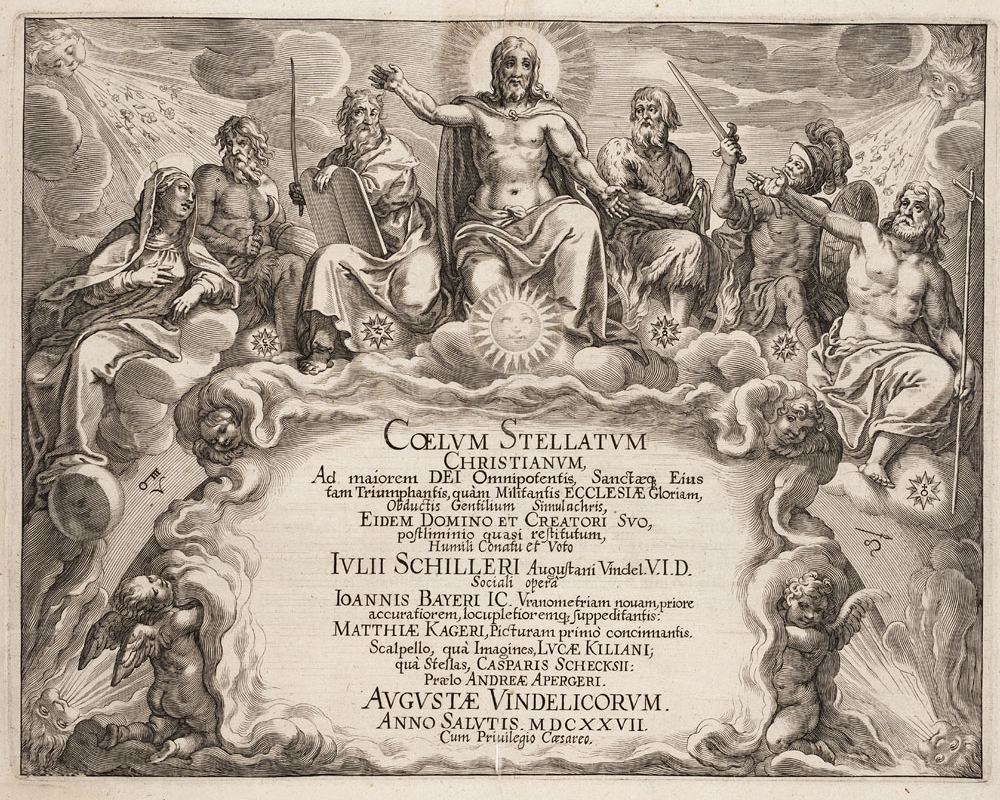
Title page of the Coelum Stellatum Christianum by Julius Schiller.

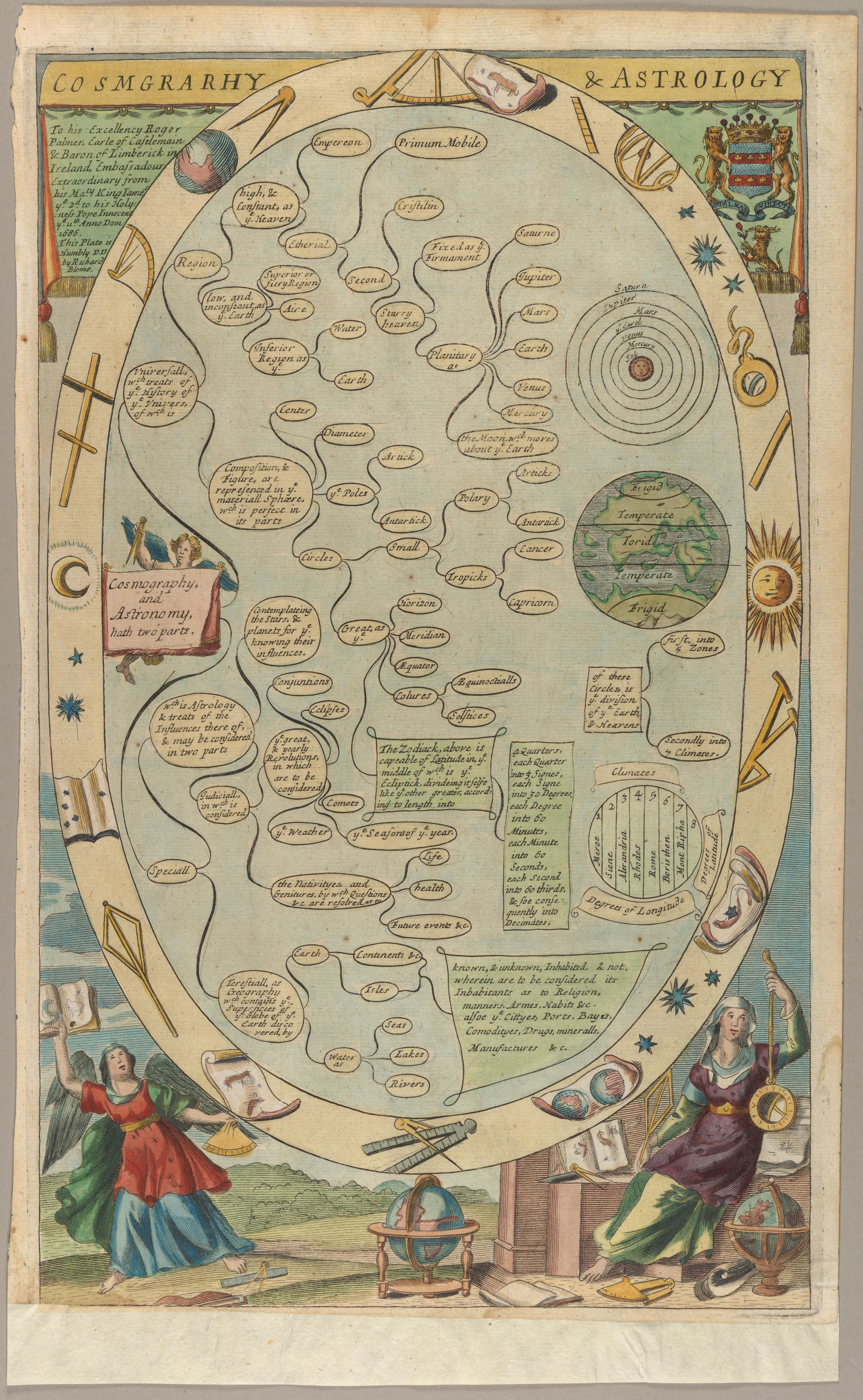
This print, published in Richard Blome's "The Gentleman's Recreation" (1686) shows the diverse ways in which cosmography can be applied

Celestial cartography, uranography, astrography or star cartography is the aspect of astronomy and branch of cartography concerned with mapping stars, galaxies, and other astronomical objects on the celestial sphere. Measuring the position and light of charted objects requires a variety of instruments and techniques. These techniques have developed from angle measurements with quadrants and the unaided eye, through sextants combined with lenses for light magnification, up to current methods which include computer-automated space telescopes. Uranographers have historically produced planetary position tables, star tables, and star maps for use by both amateur and professional astronomers. More recently, computerized star maps have been compiled, and automated positioning of telescopes uses databases of stars and of other astronomical objects.

== Etymology ==
The word "uranography" derived from the Greek "ουρανογραφια" (Koine Greek ουρανος "sky, heaven" + γραφειν "to write") through the Latin "uranographia". In Renaissance times, Uranographia was used as the book title of various celestial atlases. During the 19th century, "uranography" was defined as the "description of the heavens". Elijah H. Burritt re-defined it as the "geography of the heavens". The German word for uranography is "Uranographie", the French is "uranographie" and the Italian is "uranografia".

== Astrometry ==
Astrometry, the science of spherical astronomy, is concerned with precise measurements of the location of celestial bodies in the celestial sphere and their kinematics relative to a reference frame on the celestial sphere. In principle, astrometry can involve such measurements of planets, stars, black holes and galaxies to any celestial body.

Throughout human history, astrometry played a significant role in shaping our understanding of the structure of the visible sky, which accompanies the location of bodies in it, hence making it a fundamental tool to celestial cartography.

== Star catalogues ==
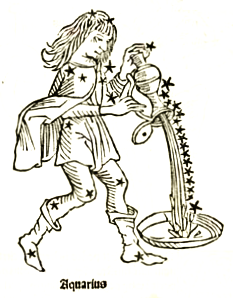
Aquarius according to Hyginus

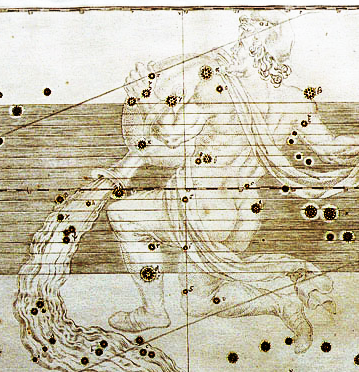
Aquarius according to Johann Bayer's Uranometria, based on Rudolphine Tables

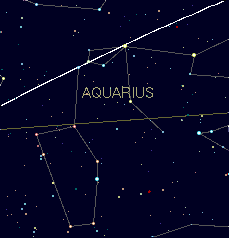
Aquarius according to KStars

A determining fact source for drawing star charts is naturally a star table. This is apparent when comparing the imaginative "star maps" of Poeticon Astronomicon – illustrations beside a narrative text from the antiquity – to the star maps of Johann Bayer, based on precise star-position measurements from the Rudolphine Tables by Tycho Brahe.

=== Important historical star tables ===
- c:AD 150, Almagest – contains the last known star table from antiquity, prepared by Ptolemy, 1,028 stars.
- c.964, Book of the Fixed Stars, Arabic version of the Almagest by al-Sufi.
- 1627, Rudolphine Tables – contains the first West Enlightenment star table, based on measurements of Tycho Brahe, 1,005 stars.
- 1690, Prodromus Astronomiae – by Johannes Hevelius for his Firmamentum Sobiescanum, 1,564 stars.
- 1729, Britannic Catalogue – by John Flamsteed for his Atlas Coelestis, position of more than 3,000 stars by accuracy of 10".
- 1903, Bonner Durchmusterung – by Friedrich Wilhelm Argelander and collaborators, circa 460,000 stars.

== Star atlases ==
=== Naked-eye ===
- 15th century BC – The ceiling of the tomb TT71 for the Egyptian architect and minister Senenmut, who served Queen Hatshepsut, is adorned with a large and extensive star chart.
- c. 1 CE ? Poeticon astronomicon, allegedly by Gaius Julius Hyginus
- 1092 – Xin Yi Xiang Fa Yao (新儀 象法要), by Su Song, a horological treatise which had the earliest existent star maps in printed form. Su Song's star maps also featured the corrected position of the pole star which had been deciphered due to the efforts of astronomical observations by Su's peer, the polymath scientist Shen Kuo.
- 1515 – First European printed star charts published in Nuremberg, Germany, engraved by Albrecht Dürer.
- 1603 – Uranometria, by Johann Bayer, the first western modern star map based on Tycho Brahe's and Johannes Kepler's Tabulae Rudolphinae
- 1627 – Julius Schiller published the star atlas Coelum Stellatum Christianum, which replaced pagan constellations with biblical and early Christian figures.
- 1660 – Jan Janssonius' 11th volume of Atlas Major (not to be confused with the similarly named and scoped Atlas Maior) featured the Harmonia Macrocosmica by Andreas Cellarius
- 1693 – Firmamentum Sobiescanum sive Uranometria, by Johannes Hevelius, a star map updated with many new star positions based on Hevelius's Prodromus Astronomiae (1690) – 1564 stars.

=== Telescopic ===
- 1729 Atlas Coelestis by John Flamsteed
- 1801 Uranographia by Johann Elert Bode
- 1843 Uranometria Nova by Friedrich Wilhelm Argelander

=== Photographic ===
- 1914 Franklin-Adams Charts, by John Franklin-Adams, a very early photographic atlas.
- The Falkau Atlas (Hans Vehrenberg). Stars to magnitude 13.
- Atlas Stellarum (Hans Vehrenberg). Stars to magnitude 14.
- True Visual Magnitude Photographic Star Atlas (Christos Papadopoulos). Stars to magnitude 13.5.
- The Cambridge Photographic Star Atlas, Axel Mellinger and Ronald Stoyan, 2011. Stars to magnitude 14, natural color, 1°/cm.

=== Modern ===
- Bright Star Atlas – Wil Tirion (stars to magnitude 6.5)
- Cambridge Star Atlas – Wil Tirion (Stars to magnitude 6.5)
- Norton's Star Atlas and Reference Handbook – Ed. Ian Ridpath (stars to magnitude 6.5)
- Stars & Planets Guide – Ian Ridpath and Wil Tirion (stars to magnitude 6.0)
- Cambridge Double Star Atlas – James Mullaney and Wil Tirion (stars to magnitude 7.5)
- Cambridge Atlas of Herschel Objects – James Mullaney and Wil Tirion (stars to magnitude 7.5)
- Pocket Sky Atlas – Roger Sinnott (stars to magnitude 7.5)
- Deep Sky Reiseatlas – Michael Feiler, Philip Noack (Telrad Finder Charts – stars to magnitude 7.5)
- Atlas Coeli Skalnate Pleso (Atlas of the Heavens) 1950.0 – Antonín Bečvář (stars to magnitude 7.75 and about 12,000 clusters, galaxies and nebulae)
- SkyAtlas 2000.0, second edition – Wil Tirion & Roger Sinnott (stars to magnitude 8.5)
- 1987, Uranometria 2000.0 Deep Sky Atlas – Wil Tirion, Barry Rappaport, Will Remaklus (stars to magnitude 9.7; 11.5 in selected close-ups)
- Herald-Bobroff AstroAtlas – David Herald & Peter Bobroff (stars to magnitude 9 in main charts, 14 in selected sections)
- Millennium Star Atlas – Roger Sinnott, Michael Perryman (stars to magnitude 11)
- Field Guide to the Stars and Planets – Jay M. Pasachoff, Wil Tirion charts (stars to magnitude 7.5)
- SkyGX (still in preparation) – Christopher Watson (stars to magnitude 12)
- The Great Atlas of the Sky – Piotr Brych (2,400,000 stars to magnitude 12, galaxies to magnitude 18).
- Interstellarum Deep Sky Atlas (2014) – Ronald Stoyan and Stephan Schurig (stars to magnitude 9.5)

=== Computerized ===
- 100,000 Stars
- Cartes du Ciel
- Celestia
- Stars and Planets for Android
- Stars and Planets for iOS
- CyberSky
- GoSkyWatch Planetarium
- Google Sky
- KStars
- Stellarium
- SKY-MAP.ORG
- SkyMap Online
- WorldWide Telescope
- XEphem, for Unix-like systems
- Stellarmap.com – online map of the stars
- Star Walk and Kepler Explorer OpenLab: 2 celestial cartography apps for smartphones
- SpaceEngine

=== Free and printable from files ===
- The TriAtlas Project
- DeepSky Hunter Star Atlas
- Andrew Johnson mag 7

== See also ==
- Star chart
- Cosmography
- Cheonsang Yeolcha Bunyajido
- History of cartography
- Planetarium
- PP3
