= Harmonia Macrocosmica =

Book by Andreas Cellarius

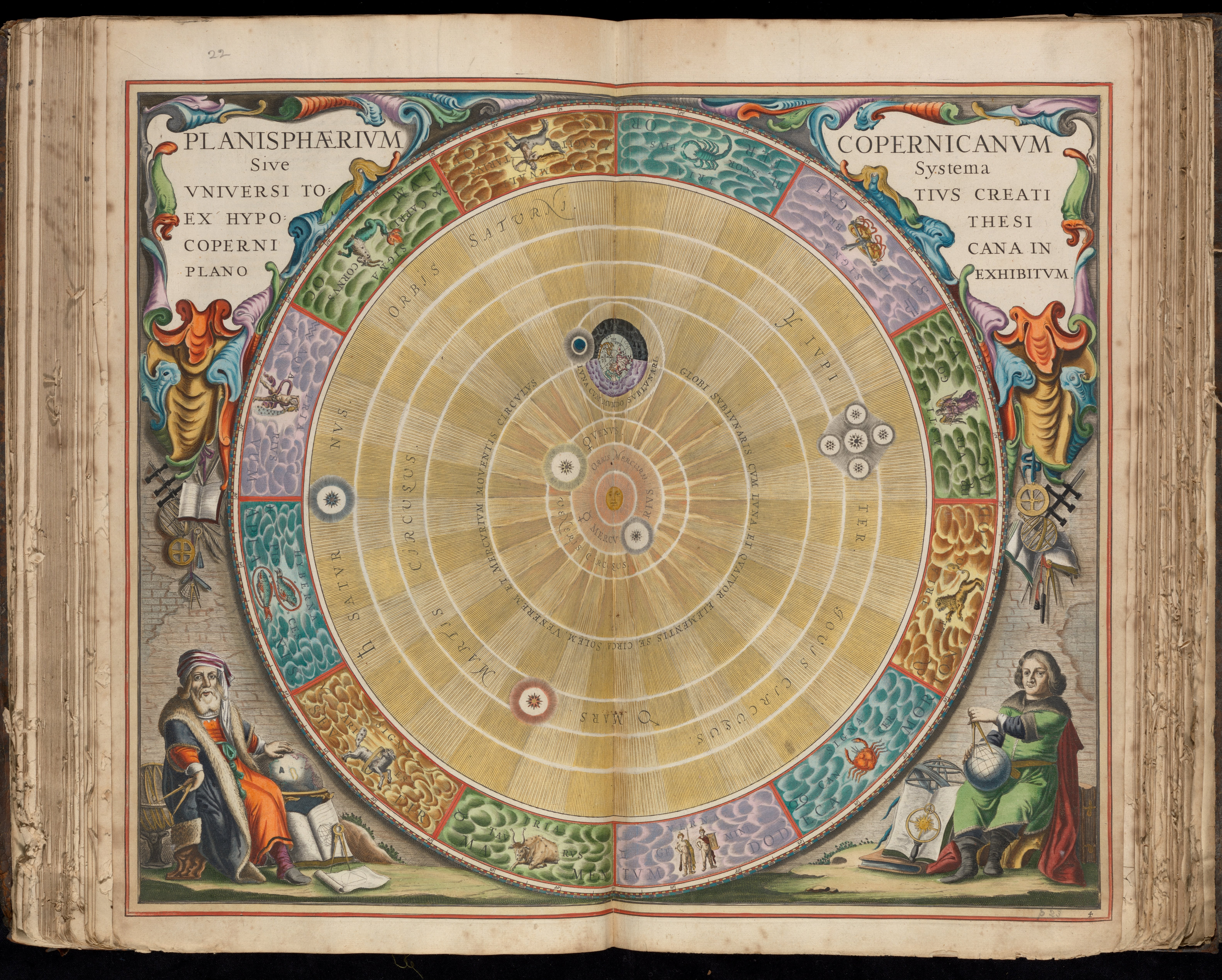
- PLANISPHÆRIVM COPERNICANVM. Plate 22 of the First Edition
- Author: Andreas Cellarius
- Illustrator: Frederik Hendrik van den Hove, Johannes van Loon e.a.
- Language: Latin, Dutch, German, French
- Publisher: Johannes Janssonius
- Publication date: 1660
- Publication place: Netherlands
- Media type: Stellar Atlas
- number of plates = 29

Harmonia Macrocosmica is a celestial atlas written by Andreas Cellarius and published in 1660 in Amsterdam by the cartographic publisher Johannes Janssonius. It is regarded as an important work in the history of celestial cartography and was produced during the Golden Age of Netherlandish cartography.

The atlas contains engraved diagrams illustrating several cosmological systems discussed in early modern astronomy, including those associated with Claudius Ptolemy, Nicolaus Copernicus, and Tycho Brahe. It also includes star charts depicting the constellations of the northern and southern skies.

Cellarius intended Harmonia Macrocosmica to serve as the introductory astronomical volume of a larger work on cosmography. A planned second volume was never published.

== History ==
The celestial atlas Harmonia Macrocosmica was published in Amsterdam in 1660 by the map publisher Johannes Janssonius. It was created by the German–Dutch cosmographer Andreas Cellarius as part of a larger cosmographical project.

The volume contains diagrams illustrating several cosmological systems, including those associated with Claudius Ptolemy, Nicolaus Copernicus, and Tycho Brahe. It also includes celestial charts depicting the constellations, some of which follow the Christianized constellation system introduced by Julius Schiller in Coelum stellatum christianum (1627).

Cellarius intended the atlas to serve as the introductory historical and astronomical volume of a planned two-part work on cosmography. The second volume was never published.

== Description ==
The atlas is divided into two main parts. The first contains a series of copper-engraved plates illustrating different models of the universe that were discussed in early modern astronomy. These include the geocentric system associated with Claudius Ptolemy, the heliocentric system proposed by Nicolaus Copernicus, and the geo-heliocentric system developed by Tycho Brahe. The diagrams show how each system explained the motions of the Sun, Moon, and planets.

The later plates contain star charts showing the constellations of the northern and southern skies. These include the traditional constellations known from classical astronomy, as well as constellations introduced by the German scholar Julius Schiller. In his work Coelum stellatum christianum (1627), Schiller replaced many of the classical constellation figures with Christian and biblical figures. Cellarius included these alternative constellations alongside the traditional ones in the atlas.

=== Origins of the engravings ===
Of the various engravers and artists who worked on the plates of the atlas, only two signed their work. The frontispiece was created by the Dutch engraver Frederik Hendrik van den Hove, while ten of the plates were engraved by Johannes van Loon.

The figures used for the classical constellations were not newly designed for the atlas. Instead, they were based on earlier constellation images created by the Dutch engraver Jan Pieterszoon Saenredam, whose work influenced later celestial atlases of the seventeenth century.
