= Intergalactic =

Intergalactic may refer to:

- "Intergalactic" (song), a song by the Beastie Boys
- Intergalactic (TV series), a 2021 UK science fiction TV series
- Intergalactic space
- Intergalactic travel, travel between galaxies in science fiction and speculation
- "Intergalactic", a song by the Smashing Pumpkins from Atum: A Rock Opera in Three Acts
- Intergalactic: The Heretic Prophet, an upcoming video game

== See also ==
- Interstellar (disambiguation)
- Interplanetary (disambiguation)
- Entergalactic (disambiguation)
