= Popular Astronomy =

Popular Astronomy may refer to:

- Popular Astronomy (US magazine), the magazine published from 1893-1951 in the US
- Popular Astronomy (UK magazine), the magazine published in the UK since 1953
- Populär Astronomi, a Swedish magazine
