= Millennium Star Atlas =

The Millennium Star Atlas was constructed as a collaboration between a team at Sky & Telescope led by Roger Sinnott, and the European Space Agency's Hipparcos project, led by Michael Perryman. This 1997 work was the first sky atlas to include the Hipparcos and Tycho Catalogue data, extending earlier undertakings in terms of completeness and uniformity to a magnitude limit of around 10–11 magnitude. It appeared as a stand-alone publication, and as three volumes of the 17-volume Hipparcos Catalogue.

The 1548 charts include one million stars from the Hipparcos and Tycho-1 Catalogues, three times as many as in any previous all-sky atlas; more than 8000 galaxies with their orientation; outlines of many bright and dark nebulae; the location of many open and globular clusters; and some 250 of the brightest quasars. The non-stellar objects in the atlas are identified by type and designation. The chart scale is 100 arcsec/mm, matching that at the focus of an 8-inch f/10 Schmidt-Cassegrain. Star magnitudes are essentially Johnson V. Distance labels are given for stars within 200 light-years of the Sun. Proper motion arrows are given for stars with motions exceeding 0.2 arcsec/yr. Variable stars are indicated by amplitude and variability type. Many thousands of already known and newly discovered double stars are depicted with tick marks indicating separation and position angle.

Other major celestial atlases since 1997 have also incorporated the Hipparcos and Tycho Catalogue data. These include Sky Atlas 2000.0 (2nd edition to 8.5 mag), the Cambridge Star Atlas (3rd edition to 6.5 mag), Uranometria 2000.0 (2nd edition to 9.7 mag), the Bright Star Atlas 2000.0 (to 6.5 mag), and the Pocket Sky Atlas (to 7.6 mag).
