= De mundi creatione =

Twelfth-century cosmographic poem by Gerald of Wales

- On the Creation of the World
- The opening page of the Cosmographia from Trinity College MS R.7.11
- Full title: De mundi creatione et contentis ejusdem
- Author(s): Gerald of Wales
- Language: Latin
- Date: c. 1166-1176

De mundi creatione, or On the Creation of the World, is a twelfth-century Latin cosmographic poem by Gerald of Wales describing the creation of the world and man.

It survives in Gerald's Symbolum electorum and contains part or all of his otherwise-lost Cosmographia. It has been described as "almost an epitome" of Bernard Silvestris's Cosmographia, and shows that Gerald accepted contemporary theoretical models of the world.

== Composition ==
Gerald referred to an early Cronographia and Cosmographia as being among his own writings. Robert Bartlett dates these to c. 1166-1176, corresponding to Gerald's time studying at the University of Paris. The Cronographia is not known to survive, but Bartlett identifies De mundi creatione as containing part or all of the Cosmographia.

It survives in Gerald's anthology of his works, his Symbolum electorum, c. 1204-1205, suggesting that he continued to hold the work in esteem.

== Contents and interpretation ==
De mundi creatione is a 260-line cosmographic poem describing the creation of the world and man. It presents the natural world through the four classical elements: earth, water, fire, and air. It presents the human body through the humoral theory, where these elements have bodily equivalents with air corresponding to blood, fire to yellow bile or choler, earth to black bile, and water to phlegm.

The poem also adopts the concept of microcosm and macrocosm, where the body and the world were linked and reflected each other.

The work is conventional in its ideas and presentation and is evidence that Gerald accepted contemporary theoretical models, including standard humoral theory. It resembles Bernard Silvestris's Cosmographia and Michael Faletra has described it as "almost an epitome" of that work.

The work contains Platonic terms and themes, but it is not a Platonist work. It also reflects contemporary commonplaces, including Bede's correlation between the seasons, elements, and humours, and the traditional account of the seven planets. Robert Bartlett describes it as part of a "school of writers who were attempting a scientific synthesis on the basis of the meagre available resources."

Gerald himself considered it to reflect the teachings of philosophers, not theologians.
