= Society for Popular Astronomy =

British astronomical society

- Abbreviation: SPA
- Formation: 1953
- Region served: United Kingdom
- President: Prof Jen Gupta
- Website: www.popastro.com
- Remarks: Vice Presidents: Robin Scagell; Dr Megan Argo; Patron: Prof John Zarnecki

The Society for Popular Astronomy (SPA) is a national astronomical society based in the United Kingdom for beginners to amateur astronomy.

== History and overview ==
It was founded in 1953 as the Junior Astronomical Society by experienced amateur astronomers including Patrick Moore, Ernest Noon and Eric Turner to encourage beginners to the science and to promote astronomy among the general public.

The term "Junior" was used to denote its role compared to the long-established society the British Astronomical Association. The name was changed in 1994 to make clear that the society was for beginners of all ages, and for those who wanted a less technical approach. In 2007 a new Young Stargazer category of membership was introduced to cater specifically for members aged under 16.

The society's first patron was Dr J G Porter whose BBC radio broadcasts about astronomy preceded television's long-running series The Sky At Night. Since his death, the role has been held by certain Astronomers Royal. The society's president, who serves a two-year term, is usually a senior professional astronomer.

The SPA aims to show that astronomy can be fun and to promote an interest in observing the sky among its members. The SPA has a number of observing sections whose work members can participate in. These cover observations of aurorae, comets, deep sky, the Moon, meteors, occultations, the planets, the Sun and variable stars.

The society publishes a magazine, Popular Astronomy, which from 2011 is being published every two months. Previously it was a quarterly publication, but it now includes material that was carried in now-defunct separate regular printed News Circulars. A members-only email newsletter provides immediate news of major discoveries as well as information and reminders about society meetings and events.

The SPA offers advisory services on choosing a telescope, electronic imaging, photography and the GCSE astronomy examination.

== Observing sections ==
Section	Description	Director
Aurora	Observing the annual occurrence of the aurora and noctilucent cloud	Sandra Brantingham
Comet	Information and observations of cometary objects	Stuart Atkinson
Deep Sky	Everything beyond the Solar System including double stars, galaxies, starclusters and nebulae	David Finnigan
Lunar	All things related to observing the natural satellite	David Graham
Meteor	Meteors and how to observe them	Mark McIntyre
Occultation	Observing and recording occultation events	Vacant
Planetary	Observing the planets of the Solar System	Alan Clitherow
Solar	Information and advice on SAFELY viewing and learning more about the nearest star	Neil Waby
Variable Star	The SPA Variable Star Section observes a mixture of naked eye, binocular and telescopic variables	Matthew Barrett

== See also ==
- List of astronomical societies
