= IAU designated constellations by geographical visibility =

List of constellations by geographical visibility

The International Astronomical Union (IAU) designates 88 constellations. In the table below, they are listed by geographical visibility according to latitude as seen from Earth, as well as the best months for viewing the constellations at 21:00 (9 p.m.).

== List ==
		Geographical visibility			Celestial coordinates		
Abbrev.	Constellation	Northern- most latitude	Southern- most latitude	Month for best visibility at 21:00 (9 p.m.)	Right ascension (hours & mins)	Declination (degs & mins)	Quad
UMi	Ursa Minor	90	-10	June	+15 00.00	+77 41.99	NQ3
Cep	Cepheus	90	-10	November	+02 32.64	+71 00.51	NQ4
Cam	Camelopardalis	90	-10	February	+08 51.37	+69 22.89	NQ2
Dra	Draco	90	-15	July	+15 08.64	+67 00.40	NQ3
Cas	Cassiopeia	90	-20	November	+01 19.16	+62 11.04	NQ1
UMa	Ursa Major	90	-30	April	+11 18.76	+50 43.27	NQ2
Lyn	Lynx	90	-55	February	+07 59.53	+47 28.00	NQ2
Lac	Lacerta	90	-40	October	+22 27.68	+46 02.51	NQ4
Per	Perseus	90	-35	December	+03 10.50	+45 00.79	NQ1
Cyg	Cygnus	90	-40	September	+20 35.28	+44 32.70	NQ4
Aur	Auriga	90	-40	February	+06 04.42	+42 01.68	NQ2
CVn	Canes Venatici	90	-40	May	+13 06.96	+40 06.11	NQ3
And	Andromeda	90	-40	November	+00 48.46	+37 25.91	NQ1
Lyr	Lyra	90	-40	August	+18 51.17	+36 41.36	NQ4
CrB	Corona Borealis	90	-50	June	+15 50.59	+32 37.49	NQ3
LMi	Leo Minor	90	-45	April	+10 14.72	+32 08.08	NQ2
Tri	Triangulum	90	-60	December	+02 11.07	+31 28.56	NQ1
Boo	Boötes	90	-50	June	+14 42.64	+31 12.16	NQ3
Her	Hercules	90	-50	July	+17 23.16	+27 29.93	NQ3
Vul	Vulpecula	90	-55	September	+20 13.88	+24 26.56	NQ4
Com	Coma Berenices	90	-70	May	+12 47.27	+23 18.34	NQ3
Gem	Gemini	90	-60	February	+07 04.24	+22 36.01	NQ2
Ari	Aries	90	-60	December	+02 38.16	+20 47.54	NQ1
Cnc	Cancer	90	-60	March	+08 38.96	+19 48.35	NQ2
Peg	Pegasus	90	-60	October	+22 41.84	+19 27.98	NQ4
Sge	Sagitta	90	-70	August	+19 39.05	+18 51.68	NQ4
Tau	Taurus	90	-65	January	+04 42.13	+14 52.63	NQ1
Psc	Pisces	90	-65	November	+00 28.97	+13 41.23	NQ1
Leo	Leo	90	-65	April	+10 40.03	+13 08.32	NQ2
Del	Delphinus	90	-69	September	+20 41.61	+11 40.26	NQ4
Equ	Equuleus	90	-80	September	+21 11.26	+07 45.49	NQ4
CMi	Canis Minor	90	-75	February	+07 39.17	+06 25.63	NQ2
Ser	Serpens	80	-80	July	+16 57.04	+06 07.32	NQ3
Ori	Orion	85	-75	January	+05 34.59	+05 56.94	NQ1
Aql	Aquila	90	-75	August	+19 40.02	+03 24.65	NQ4
Mon	Monoceros	75	-90	February	+07 03.63	+00 16.93	NQ2
Sex	Sextans	80	-90	April	+10 16.29	−02 36.88	SQ2
Vir	Virgo	80	-80	May	+13 24.39	−04 09.51	SQ3
Cet	Cetus	70	-90	November	+01 40.10	−07 10.76	SQ1
Oph	Ophiuchus	80	-80	July	+17 23.69	−07 54.74	SQ3
Sct	Scutum	80	-90	August	+18 40.39	−09 53.32	SQ4
Aqr	Aquarius	65	-90	October	+22 17.38	−10 47.35	SQ4
Hya	Hydra	54	-83	April	+11 36.73	−14 31.91	SQ2
Lib	Libra	65	-90	June	+15 11.96	−15 14.08	SQ3
Crt	Crater	65	-90	April	+11 23.75	−15 55.74	SQ2
Cap	Capricornus	60	-90	September	+21 02.93	−18 01.39	SQ4
Crv	Corvus	60	-90	May	+12 26.52	−18 26.20	SQ3
Lep	Lepus	63	-90	January	+05 33.95	−19 02.78	SQ1
CMa	Canis Major	60	-90	February	+06 49.74	−22 08.42	SQ2
Sco	Scorpius	40	-90	July	+16 53.24	−27 01.89	SQ3
Pyx	Pyxis	50	-90	March	+08 57.16	−27 21.10	SQ2
Sgr	Sagittarius	55	-90	August	+19 05.94	−28 28.61	SQ4
Eri	Eridanus	32	-90	December	+03 18.02	−28 45.37	SQ1
PsA	Piscis Austrinus	55	-90	October	+22 17.07	−30 38.53	SQ4
Pup	Puppis	40	-90	February	+07 15.48	−31 10.64	SQ2
For	Fornax	50	-90	December	+02 47.88	−31 38.07	SQ1
Scl	Sculptor	50	-90	November	+00 26.28	−32 05.30	SQ1
Ant	Antlia	45	-90	April	+10 16.43	−32 29.01	SQ2
Col	Columba	45	-90	January	+05 51.76	−35 05.67	SQ1
Mic	Microscopium	45	-90	September	+20 57.88	−36 16.49	SQ4
Cae	Caelum	40	-90	January	+04 42.27	−37 52.90	SQ1
CrA	Corona Australis	40	-90	August	+18 38.79	−41 08.85	SQ4
Lup	Lupus	35	-90	June	+15 13.21	−42 42.53	SQ3
Gru	Grus	34	-90	October	+22 27.39	−46 21.11	SQ4
Vel	Vela	30	-90	March	+09 34.64	−47 10.03	SQ2
Cen	Centaurus	25	-90	May	+13 04.27	−47 20.72	SQ3
Phe	Phoenix	32	-90	November	+00 55.91	−48 34.84	SQ1
Tel	Telescopium	40	-90	August	+19 19.54	−51 02.21	SQ4
Nor	Norma	30	-90	June	+15 54.18	−51 21.09	SQ3
Hor	Horologium	30	-90	December	+03 16.56	−53 20.18	SQ1
Pic	Pictor	26	-90	January	+05 42.46	−53 28.45	SQ1
Ara	Ara	25	-90	July	+17 22.49	−56 35.30	SQ3
Dor	Dorado	20	-90	January	+05 14.51	−59 23.22	SQ1
Ind	Indus	15	-90	September	+21 58.33	−59 42.40	SQ4
Ret	Reticulum	23	-90	December	+03 55.27	−59 59.85	SQ1
Cru	Crux	20	-90	May	+12 26.99	−60 11.19	SQ3
Cir	Circinus	30	-90	June	+14 34.54	−63 01.82	SQ3
Car	Carina	20	-90	March	+08 41.70	−63 13.16	SQ2
TrA	Triangulum Australe	25	-90	July	+16 04.95	−65 23.28	SQ3
Pav	Pavo	30	-90	August	+19 36.71	−65 46.89	SQ4
Tuc	Tucana	25	-90	October	+23 46.64	−65 49.80	SQ4
Vol	Volans	15	-90	February	+07 47.73	−69 48.07	SQ2
Hyi	Hydrus	8	-90	December	+02 20.65	−69 57.39	SQ1
Mus	Musca	10	-90	May	+12 35.28	−70 09.66	SQ3
Aps	Apus	5	-90	July	+16 08.65	−75 18.00	SQ3
Men	Mensa	4	-90	January	+05 24.90	−77 30.24	SQ1
Cha	Chamaeleon	5	-90	April	+10 41.53	−79 12.30	SQ2
Oct	Octans	0	-90	October	+23 00.00	−82 09.12	SQ4

== See also ==
- Lists of astronomical objects
- IAU designated constellations by area
- Lists of stars by constellation
