= Universe: The Definitive Visual Guide =

Non-fiction book by nine British co-authors

- The Universe book cover (2nd edition, 2007).
- Language: English
- Genre: Non-fiction
- Publication date: 2005
- Pages: 528

Universe: The Definitive Visual Guide is a 528-page, non-fiction book by nine British co-authors (Robert Dinwiddie, Philip Eales, David Hughes, Iain Nicolson, Ian Ridpath, Giles Sparrow, Pam Spence, Carole Stott and Kevin Tildsley) with a short Foreword by Sir Martin Rees, first published in 2005.

The book is divided into three sections, beginning with an introduction to theories of the Universe, space exploration, Earth's view of space and how the Universe will end. The second section, "Guide to the Universe", contains information on the Sun and the Solar System, as well as the Milky Way and other types of galaxies. The last section, "The Night Sky", has full-page maps and charts of the night sky for both northern and southern viewers as well as a comprehensive list of the constellations.

The book contains full-colour pictures, maps and probe photographs. There are in-depth looks at features of planets in the Solar System, such as Venus's craters and Mars's ridges. There are also captions describing the scientists and stories behind various discoveries.

The book was produced in London by Dorling Kindersley and is published internationally. A revised and updated edition was published in September 2007, including developments such as the reclassification of Pluto as a dwarf planet. In October 2012, the book was revised for a third time adding newly discovered information about planets in other planetary systems and water on Mars. A fourth edition appeared in 2020.

== Publishing detail ==
- Dinwiddie, Robert; Philip Eales; David Hughes; Iain Nicolson; Ian Ridpath; Giles Sparrow; Pam Spence; Carole Stott; Kevin Tildsley; Martin Rees (2020). Universe (4th ed.). London: DK Pub. ISBN 978-0-2414-1274-9.
