= Interplanetary =

Interplanetary may refer to:

- Interplanetary space, the space between the planets of the Solar System
- Interplanetary spaceflight, travel between planets
- The interplanetary medium, the material that exists in interplanetary space
- The InterPlanetary File System, a distributed file system

== See also ==
- Interplanetary magnetic field
- Interplanetary mission
- Interplanetary internet
- InterPlanetary Network
- British Interplanetary Society
- Interstellar (disambiguation)
- Intergalactic (disambiguation)
