= EV Lacertae =

Star in the constellation Lacerta

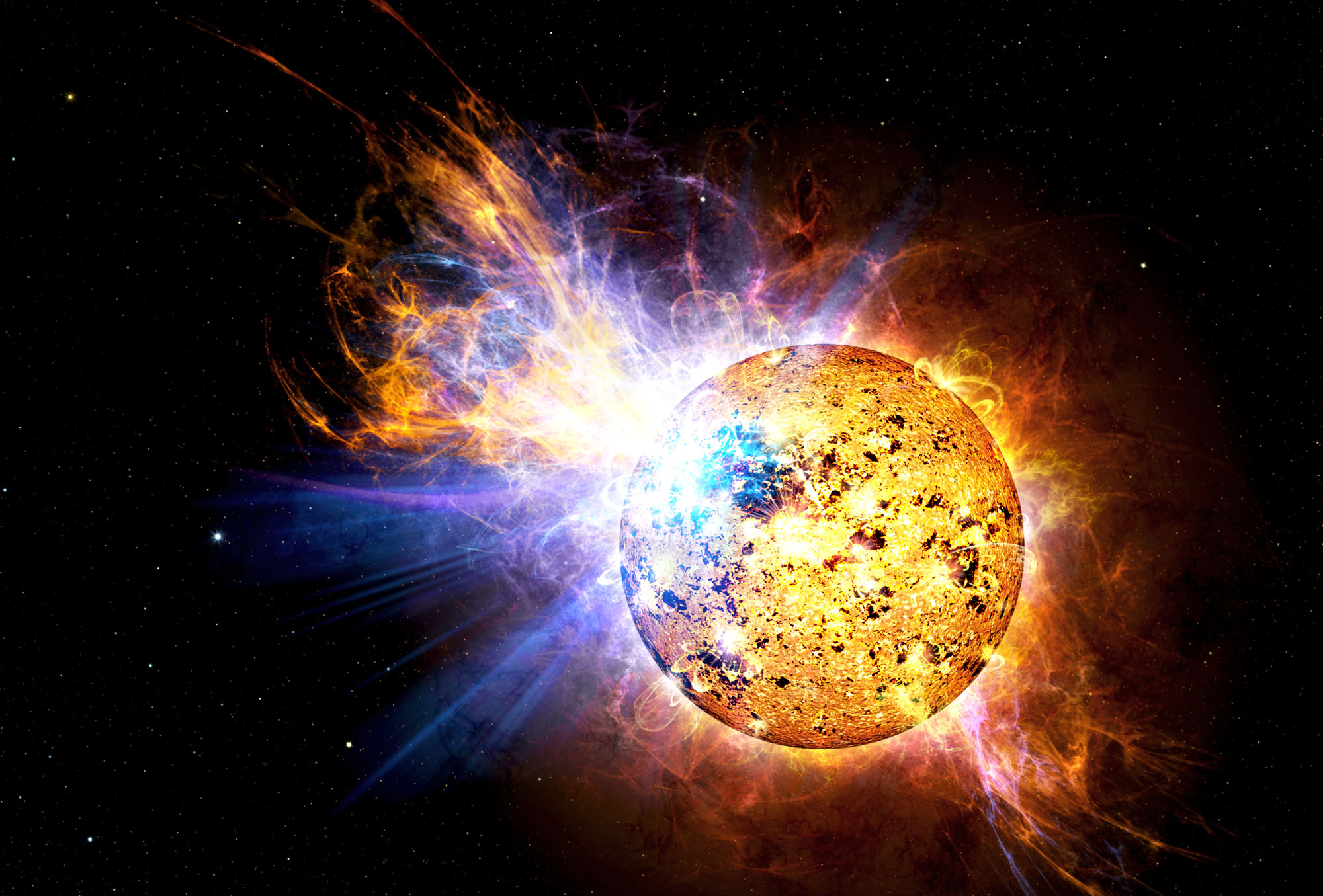
- Artist's conception of a flare explosion on EV Lacertae.

Observation data Epoch J2000 Equinox J2000
- Constellation: Lacerta
- Right ascension: 22^{h} 46^{m} 49.73126^{s}
- Declination: +44° 20′ 02.3744″
- Apparent magnitude (V): 10.26

Characteristics
- Spectral type: M3.5
- U−B color index: +0.83
- B−V color index: +1.36
- Variable type: Flare star

Astrometry
Radial velocity (R_{v})	−0.23±0.17 km/s
Proper motion (μ)	RA: –706.216 mas/yr Dec.: –458.920 mas/yr
Parallax (π)	197.9573±0.0220 mas
Distance	16.476 ± 0.002 ly (5.0516 ± 0.0006 pc)

Details
Mass	0.32±0.008 M_{☉}
Radius	0.331±0.013 R_{☉}
Temperature	3370+75 −71 K
Metallicity [Fe/H]	–0.01 ± 0.17 dex
Rotation	4.3715±0.0006 d
Rotational velocity (v sin i)	4.5 km/s
Age	300 Myr

Other designations
- EV Lac, BD+43 4305, GJ 873, HIP 112460, LHS 3853, LTT 16695, PLX 5520

Database references
SIMBAD	data
- Location of EV Lacertae in the constellation Lacerta

EV Lacertae (EV Lac, Gliese 873, HIP 112460) is a faint red dwarf star 16.48 light-years (5.05 parsecs) away in the constellation Lacerta. It is the nearest star to the Sun in that region of the sky, although with an apparent magnitude of 10, it is only barely visible with binoculars. EV Lacertae is a spectral type M3.5 flare star that emits X-rays.

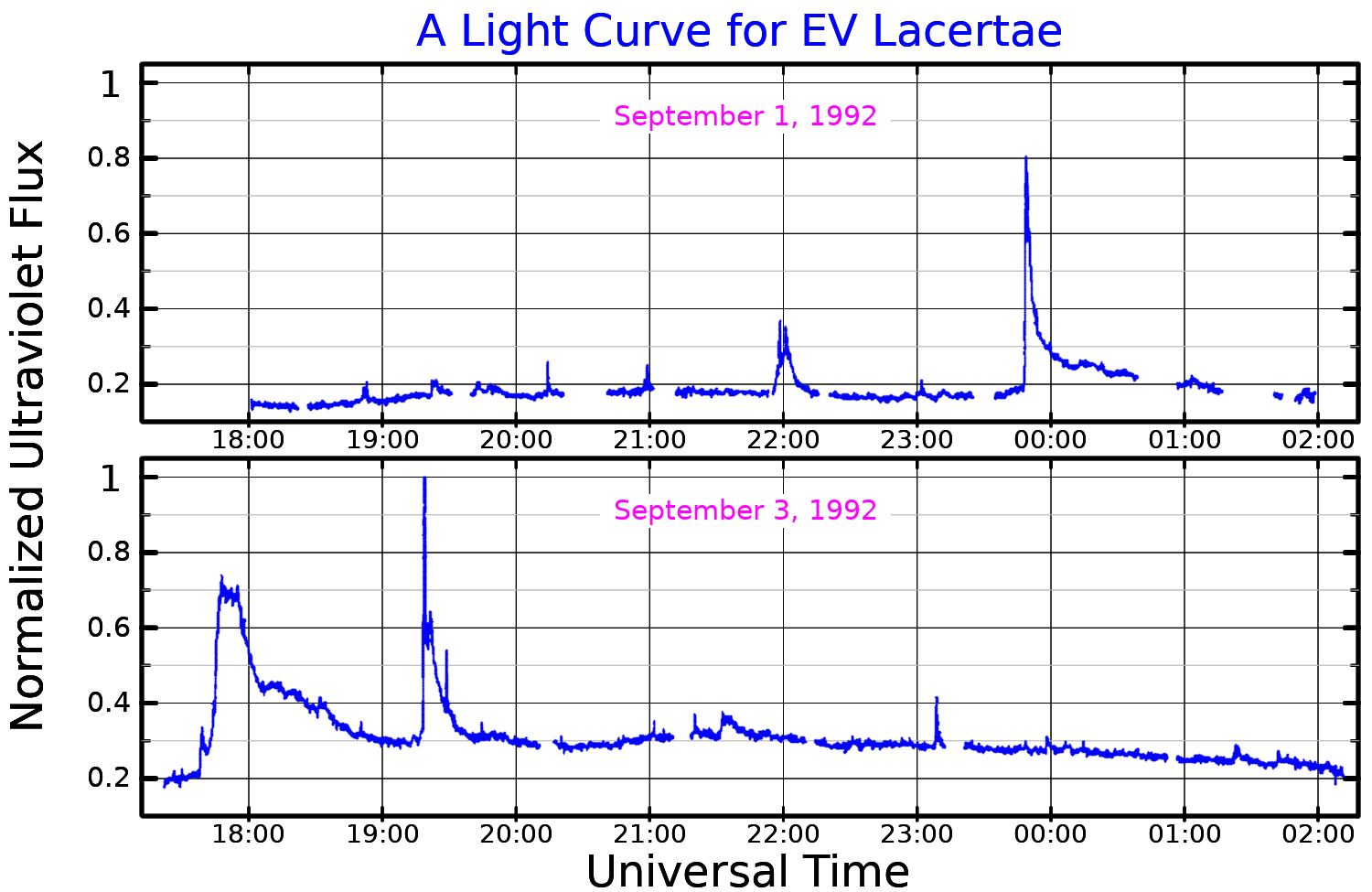
An ultraviolet band light curve for EV Lacertae, adapted from Abdul-Aziz et al. (1995)

On 25 April 2008, NASA's Swift satellite picked up a record-setting flare from EV Lacertae. This flare was thousands of times more powerful than the largest observed solar flare. Because EV Lacertae is much farther from Earth than the Sun, the flare did not appear as bright as a solar flare. The flare would have been visible to the naked eye if the star had been in an observable part of the night sky at the time. It was the brightest flare ever seen from a star other than the Sun.

EV Lacertae is much younger than that of the Sun. Its age is estimated at 300 million years, and it is still spinning rapidly. The fast spin, together with its convective interior, produces a magnetic field much more powerful than that of the Sun. This strong magnetic field is believed to play a role in the star's ability to produce such bright flares.

In October 2022, another stellar flare was observed in EV Lacertae by a group of scientists led by Shun Inoue of Kyoto University, after observing the star in near-ultraviolet and white-light curves. The finding was announced and detailed on December 31, 2023, in the pre-print server arXiv.
