= ADS 16402 =

Binary star system in the constellation Lacerta

Observation data Epoch J2000.0 Equinox ICRS
- Constellation: Lacerta
- ADS 16402 A
- Right ascension: 22^{h} 57^{m} 45.9211^{s}
- Declination: +38° 40′ 27.200″
- Apparent magnitude (V): +10.0
- ADS 16402 B (HAT-P-1)
- Right ascension: 22^{h} 57^{m} 46.8442^{s}
- Declination: +38° 40′ 30.358″
- Apparent magnitude (V): +10.4

Characteristics

ADS 16402 A
- Spectral type: F8/G0V
- Apparent magnitude (J): 8.670±0.021
- Apparent magnitude (H): 8.467±0.044
- Apparent magnitude (K): 8.405±0.020

ADS 16402 B (HAT-P-1)
- Spectral type: F8/G0V
- Apparent magnitude (J): 9.156±0.026
- Apparent magnitude (H): 8.923±0.030
- Apparent magnitude (K): 8.858±0.018
- Variable type: planetary transit

Astrometry

ADS 16402 A
Radial velocity (R_{v})	−3.43 ± 0.32 km/s
Proper motion (μ)	RA: 32.079(15) mas/yr Dec.: −42.076(18) mas/yr
Parallax (π)	6.2364±0.0164 mas
Distance	523 ± 1 ly (160.3 ± 0.4 pc)
Absolute magnitude (M_{V})	3.4 ± 0.3

ADS 16402 B (HAT-P-1)
Radial velocity (R_{v})	−2.94 ± 0.56 km/s
Proper motion (μ)	RA: 32.422(14) mas/yr Dec.: −41.949(13) mas/yr
Parallax (π)	6.2438±0.0146 mas
Distance	522 ± 1 ly (160.2 ± 0.4 pc)
Absolute magnitude (M_{V})	3.7 ± 0.3

Details

ADS 16402 A
Mass	1.16 ± 0.11 M_{☉}
Radius	1.123 ^{+0.14}_{−0.10} R_{☉}
Luminosity	1.82 ^{+0.75}_{−0.53} L_{☉}
Surface gravity (log g)	4.36 ± 0.03 cgs
Temperature	6251 ± 17 K
Metallicity [Fe/H]	0.146 ± 0.014 dex
Rotational velocity (v sin i)	7.1 ± 0.3 km/s
Age	1.9 ± 0.6 Gyr

ADS 16402 B (HAT-P-1)
Mass	1.151 ^{+0.052}_{−0.051} M_{☉}
Radius	1.174 ^{+0.026}_{−0.027} R_{☉}
Luminosity	1.585 ^{+0.099}_{−0.094} L_{☉}
Surface gravity (log g)	4.43 ± 0.02 cgs
Temperature	6049 ± 8 K
Metallicity [Fe/H]	0.155 ± 0.007 dex
Rotational velocity (v sin i)	2.2 ± 0.2 km/s
Age	1.9 ± 0.6 Gyr

Position (relative to ADS 16402 A)
Angular distance	11.26 ± 0.03″

Other designations
- BD+37°4734, CCDM J22578+3840, WDS J22578+3840, HJ 1832
- ADS 16402 A: PPM 88381, 2MASS J22574592+3840272, Gaia DR3 1928431764627661312
- ADS 16402 B: HAT-P-1, PPM 88382, 2MASS J22574684+3840302, Gaia DR3 1928431764627661440

Database references
SIMBAD	ADS 16402
- ADS 16402 A
- HAT-P-1

ADS 16402 is a binary star system, composed of two sun-like stars located approximately 525 light-years away in the constellation Lacerta. It was first identified as a binary star by John Herschel in 1831. The two stars are separated by 11.26 arcseconds which leads to a projected separation of roughly 1500 astronomical units at the distance of ADS 16402. The star system is estimated to be 1.9 ± 0.6 billion years old. The secondary star ADS 16402 B is also designated HAT-P-1.

== Planetary system ==
On September 14, 2006 the HATNet Project announced their first extrasolar planet discovery HAT-P-1b, a hot jupiter type gas giant in orbit around the secondary star ADS 16402B. Following the designation scheme used by the HATNet Project, the secondary star is known as HAT-P-1, and the planet itself designated HAT-P-1b.

The HAT-P-1 planetary system
Companion (in order from star)	Mass	Semimajor axis (AU)	Orbital period (days)	Eccentricity	Inclination (°)	Radius
b	0.529 ± 0.020 M_{J}	0.05561 ± 0.00083	4.4652968 ± 0.0000018	0	85.634 ± 0.056	1.319 ± 0.019 R_{J}

== See also ==
- HATNet Project or HAT
