= Entergalactic =

Entergalactic may refer to:

- Entergalactic (album), a 2022 album by Kid Cudi
- Entergalactic (TV special), a TV special on Netflix
  - Entergalactic (Original Score), a film score composed by Dot da Genius and Plain Pat
- "Enter Galactic (Love Connection Part I)", a song by Kid Cudi from Man on the Moon: The End of Day
- "Enter Galactic!", the 17th episode of Pokémon: Diamond and Pearl: Battle Dimension
