= IC 5217 =

Planetary Nebula in the constellation of Lacerta

Emission nebula
- Planetary nebula
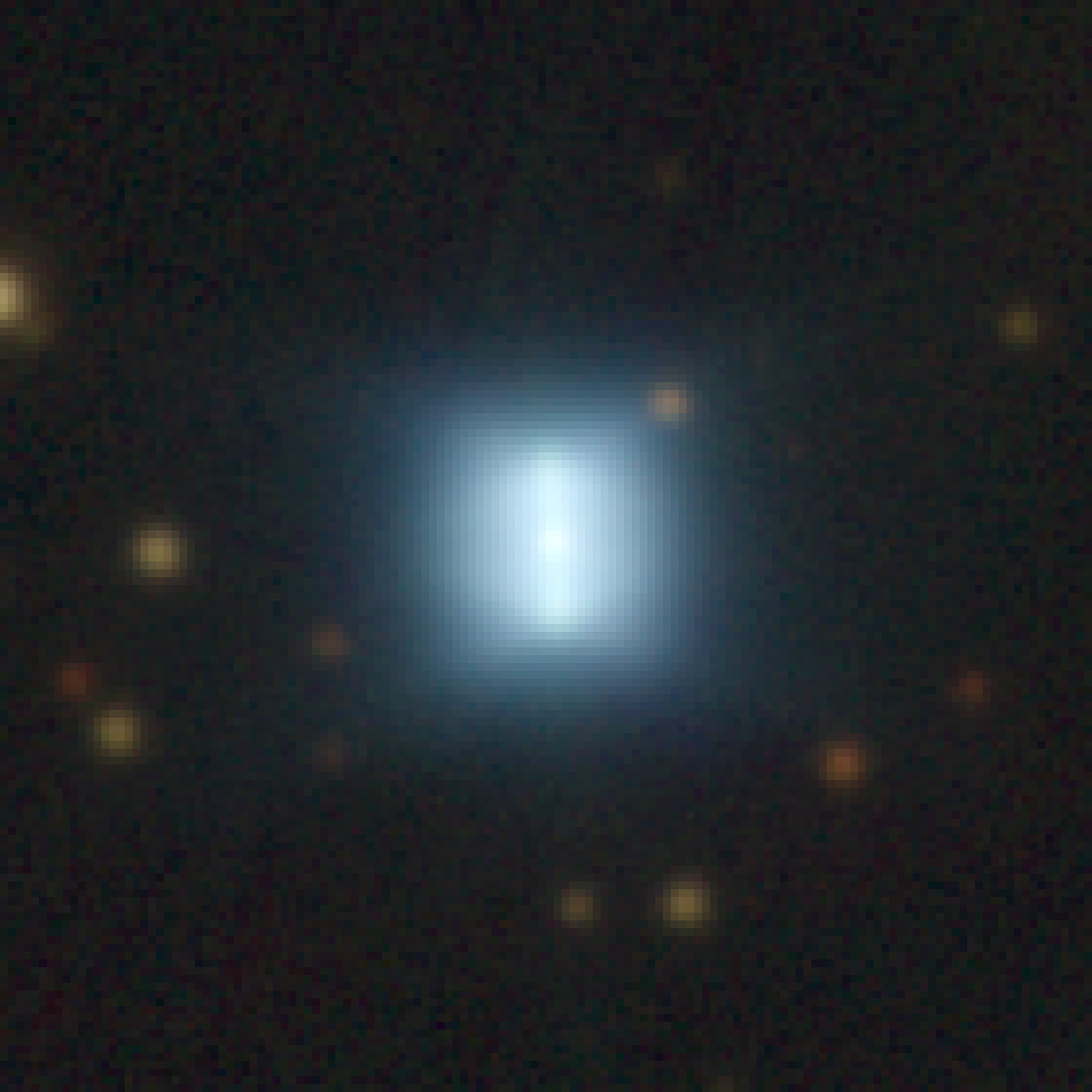
- Filtered Pan-STARRS image of IC 5217, showing the equatorial ring

Observation data: J2000 epoch
- Right ascension: 22^{h} 23^{m} 55.718^{s}
- Declination: 50° 58′ 00.464″
- Apparent magnitude (V): 12.6
- Apparent dimensions (V): 7″
- Constellation: Lacerta
- Designations: PN 100.6 −5.4, HD 212534

IC 5217 is a planetary nebula in the northern constellation of Lacerta. It was discovered in 1904 by Scottish astronomer Williamina Fleming. In 1910, the planetary was included as entry No. 5217 in the Second Index Catalogue of Nebulae and Clusters of Stars by J. E. L. Dreyer. It requires a telescope to view, having an apparent visual magnitude of 12.6 and an angular size of 7″.

Spectra indicate the composition of this nebula is relatively homogeneous with only a low level of interstellar absorption. Images of this nebula show bipolar lobes oriented along an east-west axis. These extend up to 15″ from the midpoint. The orientation of the nebula is along a position angle of 92°. An elongated structure around the waist is likely a bright equatorial ring that is being viewed from edge-on, at right angles to the lobes. The ring shows a velocity gradient that increases up to 27 km s^{–1} on the leading edges. Radio data indicates the ring is a flat disk with a hole in the center.

The central star displays Wolf–Rayet characteristics with a spectral type of WC 7. It has an apparent visual magnitude of 15.5 with an effective temperature in the range 92,000–95,000 K. The nebula was probably formed by an oxygen-rich progenitor. It appears depleted in carbon and helium compared to similar nebulae.

== See also ==
- List of IC objects
