= Cosmography =

Science of mapping the universe

The term cosmography has two distinct meanings: traditionally it has been the protoscience of mapping the general features of the cosmos, heaven and Earth; more recently, it has been used to describe the ongoing effort to determine the large-scale features of the observable universe.

== Traditional usage ==
The 14th-century work 'Aja'ib al-makhluqat wa-ghara'ib al-mawjudat by Persian physician Zakariya al-Qazwini is considered to be an early work of cosmography. Traditional Hindu, Buddhist and Jain cosmography schematize a universe centered on Mount Meru surrounded by rivers, continents and seas. These cosmographies posit a universe being repeatedly created and destroyed over time cycles of immense lengths.

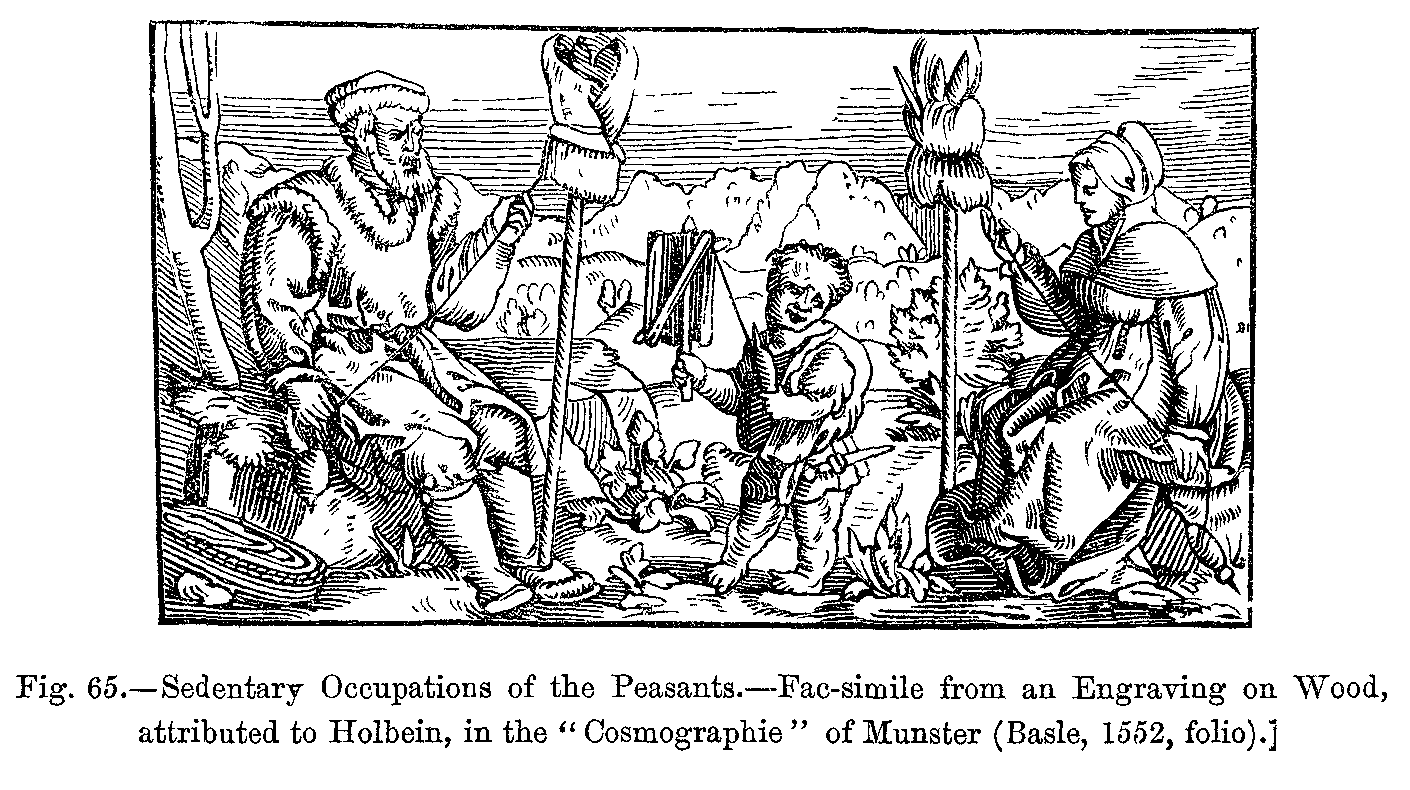
Sedentary Occupations of Peasants – by Holbein, in the "Cosmographie" of Munster (Basle, 1552, folio)

In 1551, Martín Cortés de Albacar, from Zaragoza, Spain, published Breve compendio de la esfera y del arte de navegar. Translated into English and reprinted several times, the work was of great influence in Britain for many years. He proposed spherical charts and mentioned magnetic deviation and the existence of magnetic poles.

Peter Heylin's 1652 book Cosmographie (enlarged from his Microcosmos of 1621) was one of the earliest attempts to describe the entire world in English, and is the first known description of Australia, and among the first of California. The book has four sections, examining the geography, politics, and cultures of Europe, Asia, Africa, and America, with an addendum on Terra Incognita, including Australia, and extending to Utopia, Fairyland, and the "Land of Chivalrie".

In 1659, Thomas Porter published a smaller, but extensive Compendious Description of the Whole World, which also included a chronology of world events from Creation forward. These were all part of a major trend in the European Renaissance to explore (and perhaps comprehend) the known world.

== Modern usage ==
In astrophysics, the term "cosmography" is beginning to be used to describe attempts to determine the large-scale matter distribution and kinematics of the observable universe, dependent on the Friedmann–Lemaître–Robertson–Walker metric but independent of the temporal dependence of the scale factor on the matter/energy composition of the Universe. The word was also commonly used by Buckminster Fuller in his lectures.

Using the Tully-Fisher relation on a catalog of 10000 galaxies has allowed the construction of 3D images of the local structure of the cosmos. This led to the identification of a local supercluster named the Laniakea Supercluster.

== See also ==
- Andreas Cellarius
- Chronology of the Universe
- Cosmogony
- Cosmogram
- Cosmographia
- Cosmology
- Religious cosmology
- Johann Bayer
- Julius Schiller
- Large-scale structure of the cosmos
- Star cartography
- Timeline of astronomical maps, catalogs, and surveys
- Timeline of cosmological theories
- Timeline of knowledge about galaxies, clusters of galaxies, and large-scale structure
