= Interstellarum Deep Sky Atlas =

2014 sky atlas

- Author: Ronald Stoyan and Stephan Schurig
- Language: English
- Subject: Astronomy
- Publisher: Cambridge University Press, Oculum-Verlag GmbH
- Publication date: 2014
- ISBN: 9781107503380
- OCLC: 920437579
- Website: www.deep-sky-atlas.com

The Interstellarum Deep Sky Atlas (stylized as the interstellarum Deep Sky Atlas) is a 2014 sky atlas published by German astronomers Ronald Stoyan and Stephan Schurig. The atlas has more than 2,000 deep-sky objects, including all deep-sky objects from the Abell, Hickson, Arp, Barnard, Palomar, Terzan, and Stock catalogues. The atlas is co-published by Cambridge University Press and Oculum-Verlag GmbH.

There are two editions, a larger desk edition and a smaller field edition.

The Interstellarum Deep Sky Guide, published in 2018 by Ronald Stoyan and Uwe Glahn, accompanies the 2014 atlas and has pencil drawings of deep-sky objects.
