= Ian Ridpath =

British astronomer (born 1947)

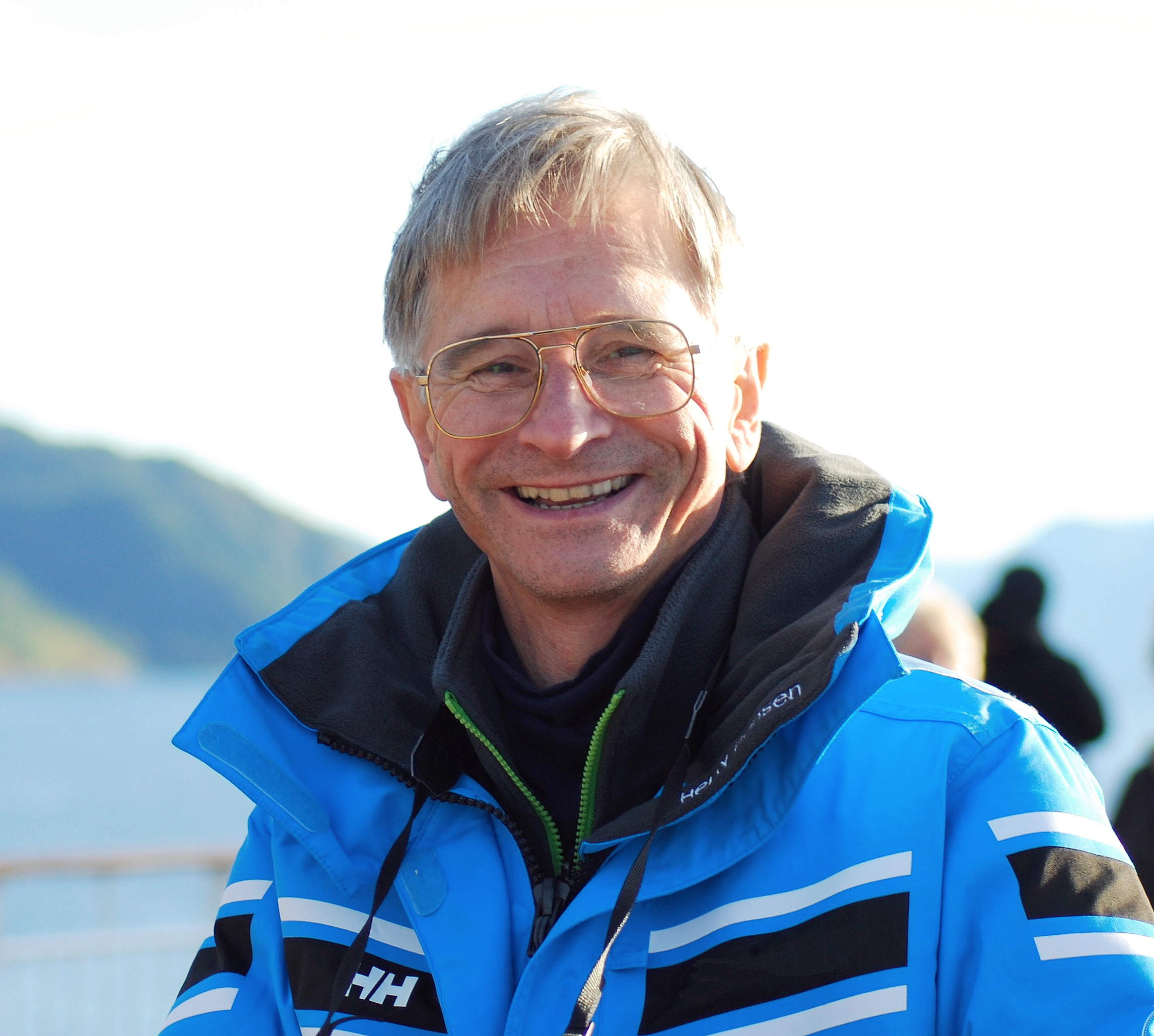
- Ridpath in 2015
- Born: 1 May 1947 (age 79); Ilford, Essex, England
- Occupations: Writer, editor, encyclopedist, broadcaster
- Writing career
- Language: English
- Notable works: Oxford Dictionary of Astronomy; Norton's Star Atlas; Star Tales
- Notable awards: Klumpke-Roberts Award of the Astronomical Society of the Pacific
- Website: ianridpath.com

Ian William Ridpath (born 1 May 1947) is an English science writer and broadcaster best known as a popularizer of astronomy and a biographer of constellation history. As a UFO sceptic, he investigated and explained the Rendlesham Forest Incident of December 1980.

== Life and career ==
Ridpath was born in Ilford, Essex. He attended Beal Grammar School in Ilford where he wrote astronomy articles for the school magazine. Before entering publishing he was an assistant in the lunar research group at the University of London Observatory, Mill Hill. He now lives in Brentford, Middlesex.

He is editor of the Oxford Dictionary of Astronomy and Norton's Star Atlas, and author of observing guides such as The Monthly Sky Guide and the Collins Stars and Planets Guide (the latter two with charts by Wil Tirion, and both continuously in print for over 30 years). His other books include Star Tales, about the origins and mythology of the constellations, and the children's book Exploring Stars and Planets, now in its fifth edition. He is a contributor to the Dorling Kindersley encyclopedia Universe, and a former editor of the UK quarterly magazine Popular Astronomy. From 2015 to 2024 he was editor of The Antiquarian Astronomer, the journal of the Society for the History of Astronomy.

His early books on the subject of extraterrestrial life and interstellar travel – Worlds Beyond (1975), Messages from the Stars (1978) and Life off Earth (1983) – led him to investigate UFOs. But he became a sceptic, a position reinforced by his findings about the Rendlesham case. He was one of the first to offer an explanation for the so-called Sirius Mystery involving the supposedly advanced astronomical knowledge of the Dogon people of Mali, west Africa.

He was a space expert for LBC Radio from the 1970s into the 1990s, and was also seen on BBC TV's Breakfast Time programme in its early years. It was for Breakfast Time that he first investigated the Rendlesham Forest UFO case.

His star show Planet Earth ran at the London Planetarium from February 1993 to January 1995; it was the last show to use the planetarium's original Zeiss optical projector.

== Awards ==
In 2012 he received the Astronomical Society of the Pacific's Klumpke-Roberts Award for outstanding contributions to the public understanding and appreciation of astronomy. In 1990 he won an award in The Aventis Prizes for Science Books (in the under-8 children's books category) for The Giant Book of Space.

== Other interests ==
From 1993 to 1995 he was race director of the Polytechnic Marathon from Windsor to Chiswick, Britain's oldest marathon race which traced its origins back to the 1908 Olympic Marathon. In that role, he was involved in a public controversy over the ownership of the Sporting Life marathon trophy, originally awarded to winners of the Polytechnic Marathon, which was claimed in 1994 by the London Marathon. The Polytechnic Marathon was last held in 1996.

A keen astro-philatelist, he is chairman of the Astro Space Stamp Society.

== Selected bibliography ==
- Stars and Planets Guide. Collins (UK). ISBN 978-0-00-823927-5. Princeton University Press (US). ISBN 978-0-691-17788-5.
- The Monthly Sky Guide. Dover. ISBN 978-0486832593.
- Astronomy: A Visual Guide. Dorling Kindersley. ISBN 978-0241317808.
- Gem Stars. Collins. ISBN 978-0-00-717858-2.
- Times Universe. Times Books. ISBN 978-0-00-716930-6.
- Exploring Stars and Planets. Philip's. ISBN 978-1-84907-144-4.
- Star Tales. Lutterworth. ISBN 978-0-7188-9478-8.
- Oxford Dictionary of Astronomy (ed.). Oxford University Press. ISBN 978-0-19-921493-8.
- Norton’s Star Alas and Reference Handbook (ed.). Dutton. ISBN 978-0-13-145164-3.
