= IAU designated constellations by solid angle =

List of constellations by area

Hydra is the largest constellation, covering more than 1/32 of the night sky and 19 times the area of Crux, the smallest constellation.

The International Astronomical Union (IAU) designates 88 constellations of stars. In the table below, they are ranked by the solid angle that they subtend in the sky, measured in square degrees and millisteradians.

These solid angles depend on arbitrary boundaries between the constellations: the list below is based on constellation boundaries drawn up by Eugène Delporte in 1930 on behalf of the IAU and published in Délimitation scientifique des constellations (Cambridge University Press). Before Delporte's work, there was no standard list of the boundaries of each constellation.

Delporte drew the boundaries along vertical and horizontal lines of right ascension and declination; however, he did so for the epoch B1875.0, which means that due to precession of the equinoxes, the borders on a modern star map (e.g., for epoch J2000) are already somewhat skewed and no longer perfectly vertical or horizontal. This skew will increase over the centuries to come. However, this does not change the solid angle of any constellation.

Rank	Abbrev.	Constellation	Solid angle ("Area") (sq. deg.)	Solid angle (millisteradians)	Percentage	Right ascension (hours & mins)	Declination (degs & mins)	Quad
01	Hya	Hydra	1302.844	396.869	3.16%	+11 36.73	−14 31.91	SQ2
02	Vir	Virgo	1294.428	394.305	3.14%	+13 24.39	−04 09.51	SQ3
03	UMa	Ursa Major	1279.660	389.807	3.10%	+11 18.76	+50 43.27	NQ2
04	Cet	Cetus	1231.411	375.109	2.99%	+01 40.10	−07 10.76	SQ1
05	Her	Hercules	1225.148	373.201	2.97%	+17 23.16	+27 29.93	NQ3
06	Eri	Eridanus	1137.919	346.630	2.76%	+03 18.02	−28 45.37	SQ1
07	Peg	Pegasus	1120.794	341.413	2.72%	+22 41.84	+19 27.98	NQ4
08	Dra	Draco	1082.952	329.886	2.63%	+15 08.64	+67 00.40	NQ3
09	Cen	Centaurus	1060.422	323.023	2.57%	+13 04.27	−47 20.72	SQ3
10	Aqr	Aquarius	979.854	298.481	2.38%	+22 17.38	−10 47.35	SQ4
11	Oph	Ophiuchus	948.340	288.881	2.30%	+17 23.69	−07 54.74	SQ3
12	Leo	Leo	946.964	288.462	2.30%	+10 40.03	+13 08.32	NQ2
13	Boo	Boötes	906.831	276.237	2.20%	+14 42.64	+31 12.16	NQ3
14	Psc	Pisces	889.417	270.932	2.16%	+00 28.97	+13 41.23	NQ1
15	Sgr	Sagittarius	867.432	264.235	2.10%	+19 05.94	−28 28.61	SQ4
16	Cyg	Cygnus	803.983	244.907	1.95%	+20 35.28	+44 32.70	NQ4
17	Tau	Taurus	797.249	242.856	1.93%	+04 42.13	+14 52.63	NQ1
18	Cam	Camelopardalis	756.828	230.543	1.83%	+08 51.37	+69 22.89	NQ2
19	And	Andromeda	722.278	220.018	1.75%	+00 48.46	+37 25.91	NQ1
20	Pup	Puppis	673.434	205.140	1.63%	+07 15.48	−31 10.64	SQ2
21	Aur	Auriga	657.438	200.267	1.59%	+06 04.42	+42 01.68	NQ2
22	Aql	Aquila	652.473	198.755	1.58%	+19 40.02	+03 24.65	NQ4
23	Ser	Serpens	636.928	194.019	1.54%	+16 57.04	+06 07.32	NQ3
24	Per	Perseus	614.997	187.339	1.49%	+03 10.50	+45 00.79	NQ1
25	Cas	Cassiopeia	598.407	182.285	1.45%	+01 19.16	+62 11.04	NQ1
26	Ori	Orion	594.120	180.979	1.44%	+05 34.59	+05 56.94	NQ1
27	Cep	Cepheus	587.787	179.050	1.42%	+02 32.64	+71 00.51	NQ4
28	Lyn	Lynx	545.386	166.134	1.32%	+07 59.53	+47 28.00	NQ2
29	Lib	Libra	538.052	163.900	1.30%	+15 11.96	−15 14.08	SQ3
30	Gem	Gemini	513.761	156.501	1.25%	+07 04.24	+22 36.01	NQ2
31	Cnc	Cancer	505.872	154.097	1.23%	+08 38.96	+19 48.35	NQ2
32	Vel	Vela	499.649	152.202	1.21%	+09 34.64	−47 10.03	SQ2
33	Sco	Scorpius	496.783	151.329	1.20%	+16 53.24	−27 01.89	SQ3
34	Car	Carina	494.184	150.537	1.20%	+08 41.70	−63 13.16	SQ2
35	Mon	Monoceros	481.569	146.694	1.17%	+07 03.63	+00 16.93	NQ2
36	Scl	Sculptor	474.764	144.621	1.15%	+00 26.28	−32 05.30	SQ1
37	Phe	Phoenix	469.319	142.963	1.14%	+00 55.91	−48 34.84	SQ1
38	CVn	Canes Venatici	465.194	141.706	1.13%	+13 06.96	+40 06.11	NQ3
39	Ari	Aries	441.395	134.457	1.07%	+02 38.16	+20 47.54	NQ1
40	Cap	Capricornus	413.947	126.095	1.00%	+21 02.93	−18 01.39	SQ4
41	For	Fornax	397.502	121.086	0.96%	+02 47.88	−31 38.07	SQ1
42	Com	Coma Berenices	386.475	117.727	0.94%	+12 47.27	+23 18.34	NQ3
43	CMa	Canis Major	380.118	115.791	0.92%	+06 49.74	−22 08.42	SQ2
44	Pav	Pavo	377.666	115.044	0.92%	+19 36.71	−65 46.89	SQ4
45	Gru	Grus	365.513	111.342	0.89%	+22 27.39	−46 21.11	SQ4
46	Lup	Lupus	333.683	101.646	0.81%	+15 13.21	−42 42.53	SQ3
47	Sex	Sextans	313.515	95.502	0.76%	+10 16.29	−02 36.88	SQ2
48	Tuc	Tucana	294.557	89.727	0.71%	+23 46.64	−65 49.80	SQ4
49	Ind	Indus	294.006	89.559	0.71%	+21 58.33	−59 42.40	SQ4
50	Oct	Octans	291.045	88.657	0.71%	+23 00.00	−82 09.12	SQ4
51	Lep	Lepus	290.291	88.428	0.70%	+05 33.95	−19 02.78	SQ1
52	Lyr	Lyra	286.476	87.266	0.69%	+18 51.17	+36 41.36	NQ4
53	Crt	Crater	282.398	86.023	0.68%	+11 23.75	−15 55.74	SQ2
54	Col	Columba	270.184	82.303	0.65%	+05 51.76	−35 05.67	SQ1
55	Vul	Vulpecula	268.165	81.688	0.65%	+20 13.88	+24 26.56	NQ4
56	UMi	Ursa Minor	255.864	77.941	0.62%	+15 00.00	+77 41.99	NQ3
57	Tel	Telescopium	251.512	76.615	0.61%	+19 19.54	−51 02.21	SQ4
58	Hor	Horologium	248.885	75.815	0.60%	+03 16.56	−53 20.18	SQ1
59	Pic	Pictor	246.739	75.161	0.60%	+05 42.46	−53 28.45	SQ1
60	PsA	Piscis Austrinus	245.375	74.745	0.59%	+22 17.07	−30 38.53	SQ4
61	Hyi	Hydrus	243.035	74.033	0.59%	+02 20.65	−69 57.39	SQ1
62	Ant	Antlia	238.901	72.773	0.58%	+10 16.43	−32 29.01	SQ2
63	Ara	Ara	237.057	72.212	0.57%	+17 22.49	−56 35.30	SQ3
64	LMi	Leo Minor	231.956	70.658	0.56%	+10 14.72	+32 08.08	NQ2
65	Pyx	Pyxis	220.833	67.270	0.54%	+08 57.16	−27 21.10	SQ2
66	Mic	Microscopium	209.513	63.821	0.51%	+20 57.88	−36 16.49	SQ4
67	Aps	Apus	206.327	62.851	0.50%	+16 08.65	−75 18.00	SQ3
68	Lac	Lacerta	200.688	61.133	0.49%	+22 27.68	+46 02.51	NQ4
69	Del	Delphinus	188.549	57.435	0.46%	+20 41.61	+11 40.26	NQ4
70	Crv	Corvus	183.801	55.989	0.45%	+12 26.52	−18 26.20	SQ3
71	CMi	Canis Minor	183.367	55.857	0.44%	+07 39.17	+06 25.63	NQ2
72	Dor	Dorado	179.173	54.579	0.43%	+05 14.51	−59 23.22	SQ1
73	CrB	Corona Borealis	178.710	54.438	0.43%	+15 50.59	+32 37.49	NQ3
74	Nor	Norma	165.290	50.350	0.40%	+15 54.18	−51 21.09	SQ3
75	Men	Mensa	153.484	46.754	0.37%	+05 24.90	−77 30.24	SQ1
76	Vol	Volans	141.354	43.059	0.34%	+07 47.73	−69 48.07	SQ2
77	Mus	Musca	138.355	42.145	0.34%	+12 35.28	−70 09.66	SQ3
78	Tri	Triangulum	131.847	40.163	0.32%	+02 11.07	+31 28.56	NQ1
79	Cha	Chamaeleon	131.592	40.085	0.32%	+10 41.53	−79 12.30	SQ2
80	CrA	Corona Australis	127.696	38.898	0.31%	+18 38.79	−41 08.85	SQ4
81	Cae	Caelum	124.865	38.036	0.30%	+04 42.27	−37 52.90	SQ1
82	Ret	Reticulum	113.936	34.707	0.28%	+03 55.27	−59 59.85	SQ1
83	TrA	Triangulum Australe	109.978	33.501	0.27%	+16 04.95	−65 23.28	SQ3
84	Sct	Scutum	109.114	33.238	0.26%	+18 40.39	−09 53.32	SQ4
85	Cir	Circinus	93.353	28.437	0.23%	+14 34.54	−63 01.82	SQ3
86	Sge	Sagitta	79.932	24.349	0.19%	+19 39.05	+18 51.68	NQ4
87	Equ	Equuleus	71.641	21.823	0.17%	+21 11.26	+07 45.49	NQ4
88	Cru	Crux	68.447	20.850	0.17%	+12 26.99	−60 11.19	SQ3

== See also ==
- IAU designated constellations by geographical visibility
- Lists of astronomical objects
- Lists of stars by constellation

== Sources ==
- Constellations – Ian Ridpath
- Constellations – RASC Calgary Centre
