= Andreas Cellarius =

Dutch–German cartographer

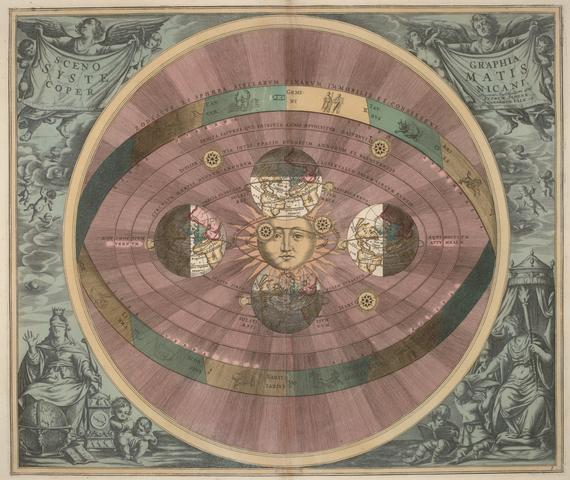
Cellarius's illustration of Copernican heliocentrism, from the Harmonia Macrocosmica

Andreas Cellarius (c. 1596–1665) was a Dutch–German cartographer and cosmographer best known for his 1660 Harmonia Macrocosmica, a major star atlas.

== Life ==
Cellarius was born around 1596 in Neuhausen, near Worms. His family name was originally Keller, which he later Latinized to Cellarius. He was educated in Heidelberg.

The Protestant Cellarius may have left Heidelberg at the onset of the Thirty Years' War in 1618 or in 1622, when the city came into Catholic hands. His activities during this period are unclear, but based on his later works it is conjectured that he spent time in Poland where he may have worked as a military engineer.

In 1625 he married Catharina Eltemans in Amsterdam. After a brief period in The Hague, the family later settled in Hoorn, where Cellarius remained for the rest of his life.

== Career ==
=== Teaching career ===
Cellarius worked as a schoolmaster in Amsterdam before relocating to Hoorn, north of Amsterdam, where he was appointed rector of the Latin School in 1637. He remained rector in Hoorn for the rest of his life, and all of his known scholarly works were produced during his years there.

=== Publications ===
During his years as rector in Hoorn, Cellarius published works on military science, geography, cosmography, and astronomy. His earliest known publication was Architectura Militaris (1645), a book on the design and construction of fortifications; a revised edition appeared in 1656. In 1659 he published Regni Poloniae, Magnique Ducatus Lituaniae… Novissima descriptio, a description and history of the Kingdom of Poland and the Grand Duchy of Lithuania. Both works were published in Amsterdam by the Jansonius press.

=== Harmonia Macrocosmica ===
Cellarius is best known for his celestial atlas Harmonia Macrocosmica, first published in 1660 (with a second edition in 1661) by the Amsterdam publisher Johannes Janssonius. The atlas was conceived as the historical introduction to a planned two-part work on cosmography, although the second volume was never published.

== Legacy ==
The minor planet 12618 Cellarius is named in his honour.
