= Popular Astronomy (UK magazine) =

British bi-monthly magazine

- May–June 2018
- Editor: Robin Scagell
- Categories: Amateur astronomy
- Frequency: Bimonthly
- Publisher: Society for Popular Astronomy
- First issue: 1953
- Country: United Kingdom
- Language: English
- Website: http://www.popastro.com/main_spa1/about-the-spa/our-lively-magazine-popular-astronomy/
- ISSN: 0261-0892

Popular Astronomy is the bi-monthly magazine of the UK's Society for Popular Astronomy, published in January, March, May, July, September and November.

== History and profile ==
The magazine was started in 1953 with the name The Junior Astronomer. Before 2011 it was a quarterly publication. Before 1981 the journal was known as Hermes, and earlier still it was called The Junior Astronomer. The magazine is published by the Society for Popular Astronomy, a national society for amateur astronomers.

The magazine aims to present the science in plain English, avoiding unnecessary jargon. As well as main features covering professional and amateur research, regular articles include:

- AstroNews - updates on some of the most interesting current developments in professional astronomy;
- Amateur Scene - a look around local astronomy clubs;
- Deep Sky Notes - surveying the season's deep celestial sights;
- Sky Diary - what's happening in the sky in the coming weeks;
- Glorious Universe - comparing amateur and professional observations of celestial objects and phenomena;
- Also, readers' letters, plus book and product reviews, society news, competitions and more.

The magazine also includes a section for Young Stargazers to help younger readers to understand modern astronomy.

== Editors past and present ==
- Richard Baum (1953 June–1955 October)
- Patrick Moore (1956)
- Richard Baum (1957 January–July)
- Gilbert Satterthwaite (1957 October–1961 April)
- John Lytheer (1961 July–1964 April)
- George Teideman (1964 July–1967 April)
- Ian Ridpath (1967 July–1974 April)
- Paul Sutherland (1974 July–1982 July)
- Enid Lake (1982 October–1985 October)
- Ian Ridpath (1986 January–1989 July; editor-in-chief until 1992 October)
- Tom Hosking (1989 October–2000 July)
- Peter Grego (2000 October–2016 February)
- Amanda Doyle (2016 February-2018 July)
- Mandy Bailey (acting ed.) (2018 July-2019 January)
- Osnat Katz (2019 January-2020 January)
- Robin Scagell (acting ed.) (2020 January- ).

Changes of name: The Junior Astronomer from 1953 June until 1960 July; Hermes from 1960 October to 1980 October; Popular Astronomy 1981 January to present.
