= Coelum Stellatum Christianum =

1627 star atlas

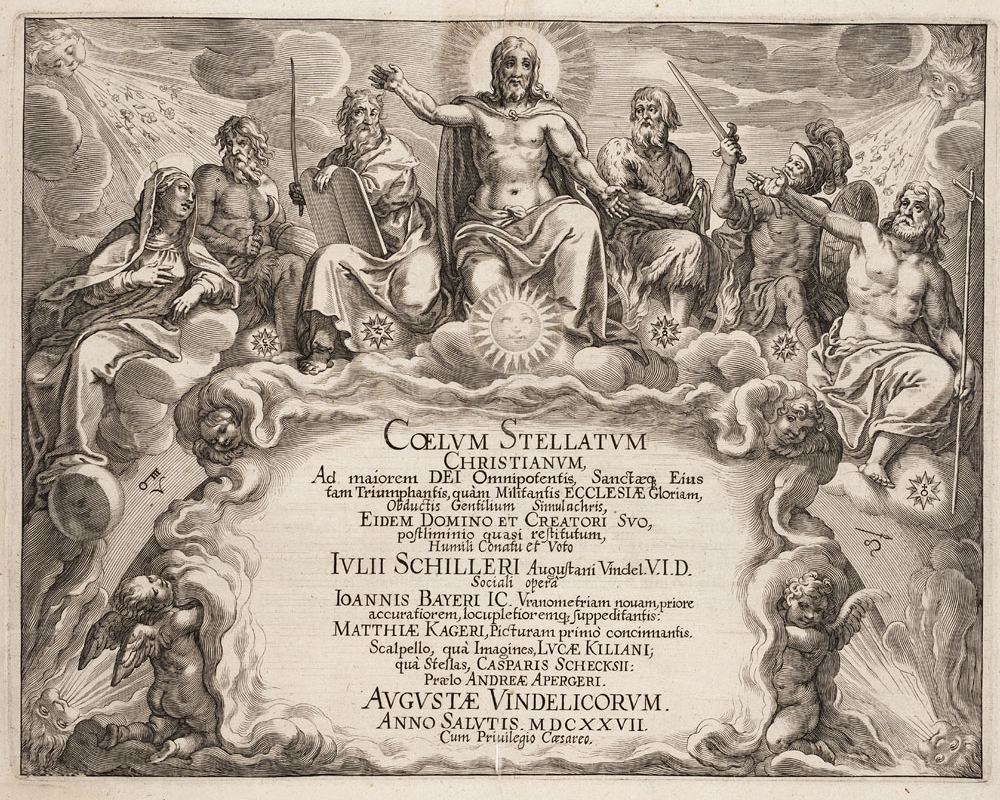
- Cover of Coelum Stellatum Christianum
- Author: Julius Schiller, Johann Bayer
- Illustrator: Lucas Kilian
- Language: Latin
- Subject: Uranography
- Publisher: Andreas Aperger
- Publication date: 1627

The Coelum Stellatum Christianum is a star atlas published in 1627 by Julius Schiller (c. 1580–1627), with the collaboration of Johann Bayer (1572–1625). In the treatise, which was published by Andreas Aperger at Augsburg during the same year as Schiller's death, pagan constellations were replaced with biblical figures and Christian motifs. Schiller replaced the zodiac constellations with the Twelve Apostles, the northern constellations with New Testament figures, and the southern constellations with Old Testament figures.

The planets, the Sun, and the Moon were also replaced by biblical figures:

- The Sun is replaced by Jesus Christ.
- The Moon is replaced by Mary.
- Mercury is replaced by Elijah.
- Venus is replaced by John the Baptist.
- Mars is replaced by Joshua.
- Jupiter is replaced by Moses.
- Saturn is replaced by Adam.

The engravings in the atlas were by Lucas Kilian.

== Constellations ==
=== New Testament ===
In general, New Testament figures and motifs correspond with constellations located to the north of the ecliptic:

| No. | IAU constellation | Coelum Stellatum Christianum (English) | Coelum Stellatum Christianum (Latin) | Image |
|---|---|---|---|---|
| I | Ursa Minor | Saint Michael the Archangel, head of the army | Sancti Michaelis Archangeli, Principis Militiæ | |
| II | Ursa Major | Barque of Saint Peter the Apostle | Naviculæ S. Petri Apostoli | |
| III | Draco | The Holy Innocent Children | Sanctorum Innocentum Puerorum | |
| IV | Cepheus | Saint Stephen the Protomartyr | Sancti Stephani Protomaryris | |
| V a. | Bootes | Saint Sylvester, Supreme Pontiff | Sancti Silvestri Pontificis Max | |
| V b. | Coma Berenices | Whip of Christ the Lord | Flagelli XPI Domini | |
| VI | Corona Borealis | The awful and thorny royal Crown of Christ the King of kings | Tremendæ et Spineæ XPI Regis Regum Coronæ | |
| VII | Hercules | The Three Holy Kings | Sanctorum Trium Regum | |
| VIII | Lyra | The thrice reverend Manger of Christ the Saviour | Ter Venerandi Præsepii Salvatoris Christi | |
| IX | Cygnus | The salvific and thrice-great Cross of Christ with its august discoverer, Saint Helena | Salutiferæ et Termagnæ Crucis XPI cum Augusta Eius Inventrice S. Helena | |
| X | Cassiopeia | Saint Mary Magdalene | Sanctæ Mariæ Magdalenæ | |
| XI | Perseus | Saint Paul the Apostle and teacher of the nations | Sancti Pauli Apostoli Gentiumque Doctoris | |
| XII | Auriga | Saint Jerome, Doctor of the Church | Sancti Hieroymi Ecclesiæ Doctoris | |
| XIII | Ophiuchus | The Holy Father Benedict among the brambles | Sancti Patris Benedicti Inter Spinas | |
| XIV | Serpens | Brambles of Saint Benedict | Spinarum S. Benedicti | |
| XV | Sagitta | Most Holy Nails and Lance of Christ the Lord crucified | Sanctiss. Clavorum et Lanceæ Christi Domini Crucifixi | |
| XVI | Aquila | Saint Catherine the Virgin and Martyr | Sanctæ Catarinæ Virginis et Martyris | |
| XVII | Delphinus | Water jug of Cana in which water was turned to wine | Hydriæ Chananeæ aquæ in vinum versæ | |
| XVIII | Equuleus | Mystic Rose or rose-branch | Rose Mysticæ sive frondis rosæ | |
| XIX | Pegasus | Saint Gabriel the Archangel | Sancti Gabrielis Archangelæ | |
| XX | Andromeda | Sepulchre of Christ Triumphant | Sepulchri XPI Triumphatoris | |
| XXI | Triangulum | Papal mitre of Saint Peter | Mitræ Pontificalis S. Petri | |
| XXXIV | Cetus | Saints Joachim and Anne, Parents of the Mother of God | Sanctorum Joachimi et Annæ Parentum Deiparæ | |
| XXXVI | Orion | Saint Joseph, Husband of Mary | Sancti Joseph Viri Mariæ | |

=== Old Testament ===
In general, Old Testament figures and motifs were applied to constellations to the south of the ecliptic:

| No. | IAU constellation | Coelum Stellatum Christianum (English) | Coelum Stellatum Christianum (Latin) | Image |
|---|---|---|---|---|
| XXXV | Eridanus | Israel crossing even through the Red Sea | Transitus Israel Nempe per Mare Rubrum | |
| XXXVII a. | Lepus | Fleece of Gideon | Velleris Gideonis | |
| XXXVII b. | Columba | Noah's dove | Columbæ Noachi | |
| XXXVIII | Canis Major | Holy King David | Sancti Regis Davidis | |
| XXXIX | Canis Minor | Paschal Lamb | Agni Paschalis | |
| XL | Puppis, Carina, Vela, Pyxis (Argo Navis) | The patriarch Noah's Ark | Archæ Patriarchæ Noachi | |
| XLI | Hydra | Jordan River (not to be confused with Jordanus) | Iordanis Fluvii | |
| XLII and XLIII | Crater, Corvus | Holy Ark of the Covenant | Sanctæ Arcæ Foederis | |
| XLIV | Centaurus | Holy patriarchs Abraham and Isaac | Sanctorum Patriarcharum Abrahami et Isaaci | |
| XLV | Lupus | Holy patriarch Israel or Jacob | Sancti Israelis Sive Jacobi Patriarchæ | |
| XLVI | Ara | Altar of offerings | Altaris Thymiamatis | |
| XLVII | Corona Australis | Crown of King Solomon | Diadematis Regis Salomonis | |
| XLVIII | Piscis Austrinus | Flour barrel of the widow of Zarephath | Hydriæ Farinæ Sarepthanæ Viduæ | |
| XLIX | Grus, Phoenix | The high priest Aaron | Aaronis Summi Sacerodotis | |
| L | Pavo, Indus | Job, servant of God | Servi Dei Iob | |
| LI | Musca | Eve, mother of all living [people] | Evæ Matris Cunctorum Viventium | |
| LII | Triangulum Australe | Mystic sign of tau | Signi Mystici Tav | |
| LIII | Volans, Dorado | The righteous Abel | Abbelis Iusti | |
| LIV | Tucana, Hydrus | Saint Raphael the Archangel | Sancti Raphaelis Archangeli | |

=== Apostles ===
The twelve zodiac signs were replaced by the Twelve Apostles, with Judas Iscariot excluded and replaced by Saint Matthias:

| No. | IAU constellation | Coelum Stellatum Christianum (English) | Coelum Stellatum Christianum (Latin) | Image |
|---|---|---|---|---|
| XXII | Aries | Saint Peter, Prince of the Apostles | Sancti Petri Principus Apostolorum | |
| XXIII | Taurus | Saint Andrew the Apostle | Sancti Andreæ Apostoli | |
| XXIV | Gemini | Saint James the Elder the Apostle | Sancti Iacobi Maioris Apostoli | |
| XXV | Cancer | Saint John the Apostle and Evangelist | Sancti Ioannis Apostoli et Evangelistæ | |
| XXVI | Leo | Saint Thomas the Apostle | Sancti Thomæ Apostoli | |
| XXVII | Virgo | Saint James the Younger the Apostle | Sancti Jacobi Minoris Apostoli | |
| XXVIII | Libra | Saint Philip the Apostle | Sancti Philippi Apostoli | |
| XXIX | Scorpius | Saint Bartholomew the Apostle | Sancti Bartholoomæ Apostoli | |
| XXX | Sagittarius | Saint Matthew the Apostle and Evangelist | Sancti Matthæi Apostoli et Evangelistæ | |
| XXXI | Capricornus | Saint Simon the Zealot the Apostle | Sancti Simonis Zelotis Apostoli | |
| XXXII | Aquarius | Saint Jude Thaddeus the Apostle | Sancti Ivdæ Thadæi Apostoli | |
| XXXIII | Pisces | Saint Matthias the Apostle | Sancti Matthiæ Apostoli | |

== See also ==
- Uranometria
- Harmonia Macrocosmica
