= Norton's Star Atlas =

Norton's Star Atlas is a set of 16 celestial charts, first published in 1910 and currently in its 20th edition under the editorship of Ian Ridpath. The Star Atlas covers the entire northern and southern sky, with accompanying reference information for amateur astronomers. The charts used in the first 17 editions of the Atlas were drawn by a British schoolmaster, Arthur Philip Norton (1876–1955), after whom the Atlas was named. Norton intended his star atlas to be used in conjunction with the highly popular observing handbooks written by the British astronomers William Henry Smyth and Thomas William Webb, and consequently most of the objects featured in those guidebooks were marked on the charts. The Atlas also found favour among professional astronomers, earning it the reputation of the most widely used and best-known celestial atlas of its day.

== Arrangement and projection ==
Norton’s Star Atlas became highly popular because of its convenient arrangement of dividing the sky into six vertical slices, or gores, like portions of a globe. Each gore covered 4 hours of right ascension, from declination 60 degrees north to 60 degrees south, drawn on a projection specially designed by Norton. The north and south polar regions of the sky were covered by separate charts on a standard azimuthal equidistant projection, extending from the celestial poles to declination 50 degrees north and south.

== Early editions ==
For the first edition, Norton based his charts on the Uranométrie Générale star catalogue compiled by the Belgian astronomer Jean-Charles Houzeau. Constellation boundaries were represented by dashed lines meandering between the stars, for no official boundaries were then established. For the 5th edition of the Atlas, published in 1933, Norton completely redrew the charts, despite now suffering from severely impaired vision in his left eye due to a blood clot behind the retina. This time he used the Harvard Revised Photometry catalogue for the positions and brightnesses of the stars. In this 5th edition the Milky Way was included for the first time, and he incorporated the official constellation boundaries that had been laid down by the International Astronomical Union in 1930.

Norton redrew his charts yet again for the 9th edition published in 1943, extending the magnitude limit of the stars from 6.2 to 6.35. Positions were now given for the standard epoch of 1950, as against 1920 previously. The 9th edition charts remained in use up to and including the 17th edition of Norton’s Star Atlas published in 1978, long after Norton’s death.

== The handbook ==
In addition to the charts, Norton’s Star Atlas also contained a reference section featuring practical information and data of particular interest to observers. Most of this text was the work of the publisher and various expert contributors. With each passing edition, the text grew into a reference handbook as essential for amateur astronomers as the charts themselves.

== Modern era ==
By the 1980s, Norton’s Star Atlas had come to look dated. In 1989 a totally new edition was published, the 18th, under the title Norton’s 2000.0 to emphasize that its charts had been redrawn to the new standard epoch of 2000. These charts were computer-plotted by the cartographic company of John Bartholomew and Son Ltd. in Edinburgh, Scotland, taking star positions and brightnesses from the most recent version of the Bright Star Catalogue, the successor to the Harvard Revised Photometry. The total number of stars plotted was over 8800, reaching to magnitude 6.5. The text was extensively rewritten and reorganized under the editorship of the British astronomy writer Ian Ridpath. For the first time in its history, Norton’s Star Atlas contained nothing by Norton himself.

A further break with the past came with the 20th edition in 2003 when publication of the title moved to New York, although the editor and contributors remained in the UK. For this edition the charts were replotted and the reference section heavily revised to reflect the latest advances in amateur astronomy.
