= Julius Schiller =

Bavarian lawyer and celestial cartographer

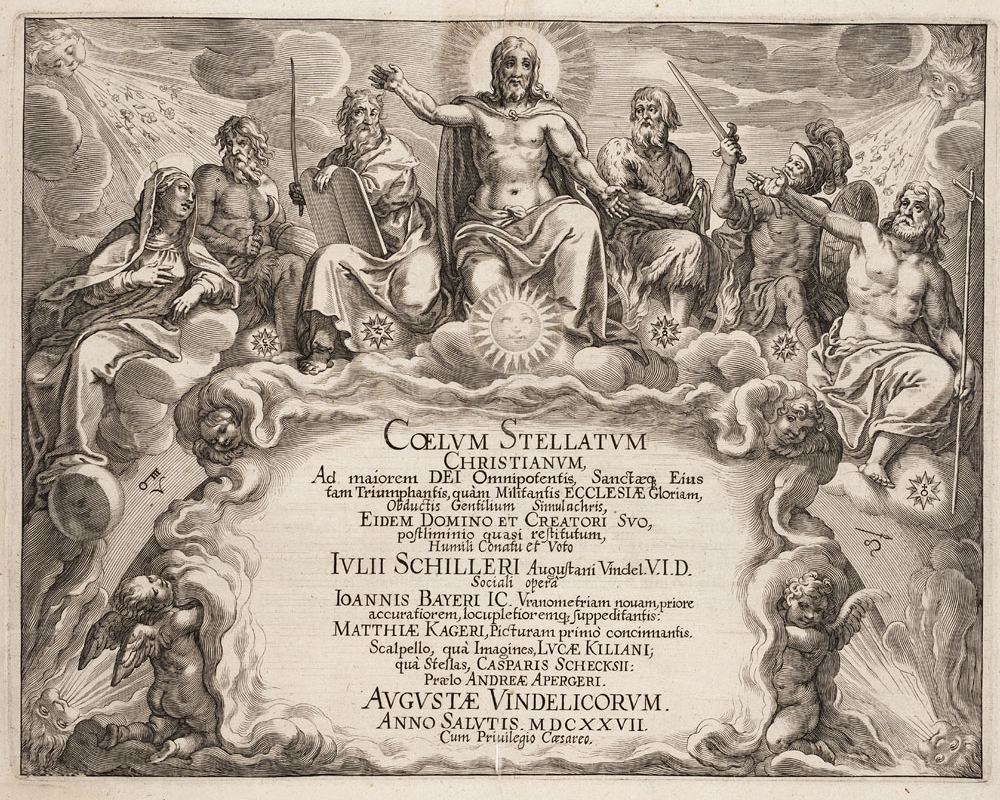
Title page of the Coelum Stellatum Christianum.

Julius Schiller (c. 1580 – 1627) was a lawyer from Augsburg who, like his fellow citizen and colleague Johann Bayer, published a star atlas in celestial cartography.

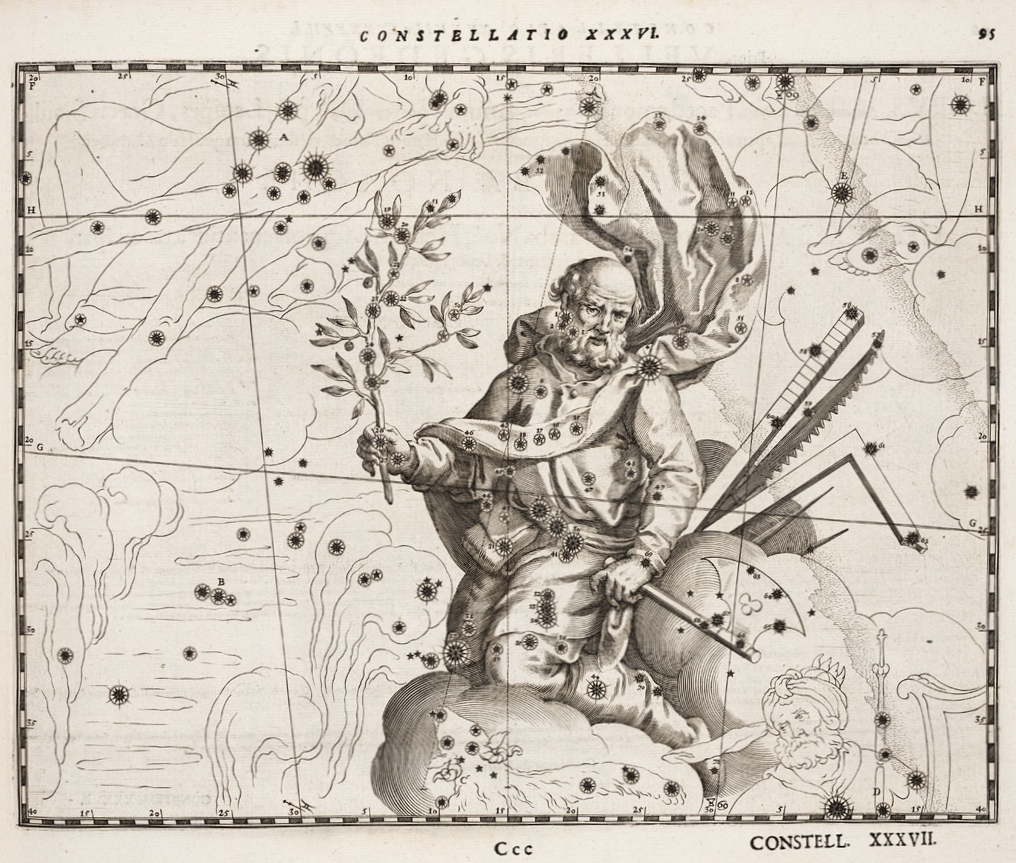
Orion is renamed as Saint Joseph.

In the year of his death, Schiller, with Bayer's assistance, published the star atlas Coelum Stellatum Christianum which replaced the pagan names of constellations with biblical and early Christian figures. Specifically, Schiller replaced the zodiacal constellations with the twelve apostles, the northern constellations by figures from the New Testament, and the southern constellations by figures from the Old Testament.

The planets, Sun, and Moon were also replaced by biblical figures.

Lucas Kilian was the artist who engraved the plates.

The star atlas was considered merely a curiosity and, in contrast to Bayer's Uranometria, did not gain wide acceptance. Harmonia Macrocosmica by Andreas Cellarius (1660) included star maps for Schiller's constellations after the pagan ones.
