= Cosmogram =

Flat geometric figure depicting a cosmology

A cosmogram depicts a cosmology in a flat geometric form. They are used for various purposes: meditational, inspirational and to depict structure – real or imagined – of the earth or universe.

A cosmogram is a schematic representation—whether graphic, physical, or architectural—that materializes the organization of the universe according to a specific historical and cultural worldview. Unlike cosmography, which is limited to the technical description of celestial and terrestrial phenomena, the cosmogram functions as an analogical model that bridges the tangible with the intangible, synthesizing religious, scientific, and philosophical dimensions into a coherent structure.

Often, cosmograms feature a circle and a square, or a circle and a cross. The circle may represent the universe, or unity, or an explanation of the universe in its totality – whether inspired by religious beliefs or scientific knowledge. The square or cross may represent the Earth, the four directions. The centre may represent the individual.

Many diagrams featuring circles and squares or crosses may be interpreted as cosmograms, although they may not be intentionally created as such. For example, traditional Chinese coins, that are round with a square hole in the middle, have been given such an interpretation, and so has the board for the game ludo (see Cross and circle game).

== Examples ==
In the 20th and 21st centuries, the framework of a traditional cosmogram is used to reflect on a particular person, persons or cultures. Often public buildings and parks host the cosmogram permanently. Examples include a memorial at the Schomburg Center for Research in Black Culture in Harlem, which commemorates the center's namesake and Langston Hughes, who during his lifetime lived near the plot of land where the center was constructed.

Strawberry Fields, the memorial for John Lennon in Central Park, fits the criteria for a cosmogram: a pattern inside the border of a circle with an inner circle inscribed "Imagine".

Hindi and Buddhist mandalas are cosmograms, but similar diagrams, known as schema, were also used in western Europe during the Middle Ages.

Architectural cosmograms – ancient city planning employed by the Aztec, Mayan and Mesopotamian cultures – used structures to reflect the cosmos.

The Kongo cosmogram, a core symbol in Bakongo religion of the Kôngo people, represents man's origin, destiny, and path to salvation. The basement floor of First African Baptist Church in Savannah, Georgia, has a Congolese cosmogram made of drilled holes in the shape of a diamond with an inner cross. This is a prayer cosmogram depicting birth, life, death and rebirth. There is speculation that this cosmogram is made of drilled holes in a floor because slaves hid underneath the panels and needed air holes for circulation.

Scholars argue cosmograms appear in performances, citing the concept albums of George Clinton's bands Parliament and Funkadelic.

== See also ==
- Sacred geometry
- T and O map
- Yantra
- Cosmography
