= Wil Tirion =

Dutch uranographer (1943–2024)

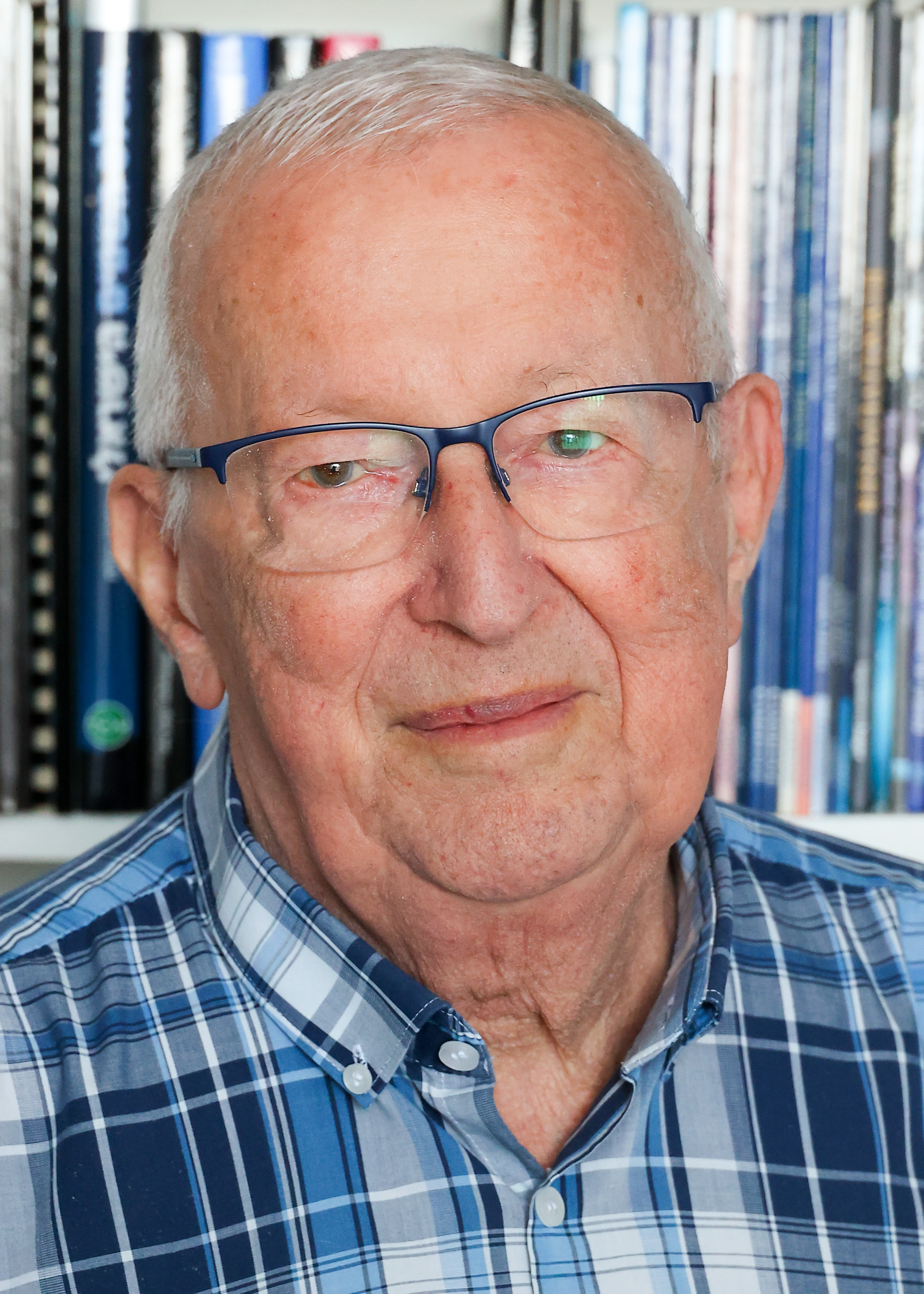
- Tirion in 2022
- Born: February 19, 1943
- Died: July 5, 2024 (aged 81); Capelle aan den IJssel, Netherlands
- Known for: celestial cartography
- Notable work: Sky Atlas 2000.0; Uranometria 2000.0

Wil Tirion (19 February 1943 – 5 July 2024) was a Dutch uranographer (celestial cartographer). His work, which included star charts and atlases, was widely distributed and renowned by astronomers.

Originally a graphic designer, Tirion became a full-time celestial cartographer after the success of his first star atlas, Sky Atlas 2000.0, published in 1981. His second major work, Uranometria 2000.0, contained over 280,000 stars and 10,000 deep-sky objects across two volumes and was published by Willmann-Bell in 1987. Tirion's sky charts have also been published in astronomy magazines and books, as well as on astronomy websites.

Tirion's early work was largely done by hand, with computer-generated plots as references. In the mid-1990s, he switched to digital illustration.

Tirion died on 5 July 2024 at the age of 81 after a brief illness. The asteroid 4648 Tirion is named for him.

== Works ==
- Lovi, George; Tirion, Wil (1989). Men, Monsters, and the Modern Universe. Richmond, VA: Willmann-Bell. ISBN 0-943396-24-7.
- Tirion, Wil; Skiff, Brian (1990). Bright Star Atlas 2000.0. Richmond, VA: Willmann-Bell. ISBN 0-943396-27-1.
- Tirion, Wil; Sinnott, Roger (1998). Sky Atlas 2000.0 (2nd ed.). Cambridge, MA: Sky Publications. ISBN 0-933346-87-5.
- Dunlop, Storm; Tirion, Wil (2000). Wild Guide: Night Sky Star Finder. London, UK: Collins. ISBN 0007100833.
- Tirion, Wil; Rappaport, Barry; Remaklus, Will (2001). Uranometria 2000.0: Deep Sky Atlas (2nd ed.). Richmond, VA: Willmann-Bell. ISBN 0-943396-73-5.
- Dunlop, Storm; Tirion, Wil (2002). Atlas of the Night Sky. London, UK: Collins. ISBN 0007103611.
- Ridpath, Ian; Tirion, Wil (2004). Collins gem: Stars. Glasgow, UK: Collins. ISBN 0007178581.
- Dunlop, Storm; Tirion, Wil (2004). Night Sky. London, UK: Collins. ISBN 0007177909.
- Ellyard, David; Tirion, Wil (2008). The southern sky guide (3rd ed.). Cambridge, UK: Cambridge University Press. ISBN 978-0-521-71405-1.
- Crossen, Craig; Tirion, Wil (2008). Binocular Astronomy (2nd ed.). Richmond, VA: Willmann-Bell. ISBN 978-0-943396-88-0.
- Tirion, Wil (2011). The Cambridge Star Atlas (4th ed.). Cambridge, UK: Cambridge University Press. ISBN 978-0-521-17363-6.
- Mullaney, James; Tirion, Wil (2011). The Cambridge Atlas of Herschel objects. Cambridge, UK: Cambridge University Press. ISBN 978-0-521-13817-8.
- Dunlop, Storm; Tirion, Wil (2011). Collins Night Sky & Starfinder. London, UK: Collins. ISBN 9780007436163.
- Heifetz, Milton D.; Tirion, Wil (2012). A Walk Through the Southern Sky (3rd ed.). Cambridge, UK: Cambridge University Press. ISBN 978-1-107-69898-7.
- MacEvoy, Bruce; Tirion, Wil (2015). The Cambridge Double Star Atlas (2nd ed.). Cambridge, UK. ISBN 9781107534209.
- Ridpath, Ian; Tirion, Wil (2017). Stars & Planets (5th ed.). London, UK: Collins. ISBN 978-0-00-823972-5.
- Heifetz, Milton D.; Tirion, Wil (2017). A Walk Through the Heavens (4th ed.). Cambridge, UK. ISBN 978-1-108-16374-3.
- Ridpath, Ian; Tirion, Wil (2019). The Monthly Sky Guide (10th ed.). Mineola, NY: Dover. ISBN 978-0-486-83259-3.
- Dunlop, Storm; Tirion, Wil (2021). 2022 Guide to the Night Sky: A Month-by-Month Guide to Exploring the Skies Above Britain and Ireland. Glasgow, UK: Collins. ISBN 978-0-00-839353-3.
- Dunlop, Storm; Tirion, Wil (2021). 2022 Guide to the Night Sky: A Month-by-Month Guide to Exploring the Skies above North America. London, UK: Collins. ISBN 978-0-00-846986-3.
- Dunlop, Storm; Tirion, Wil (2021). 2022 Guide to the Night Sky: A Month-by-Month Guide to Exploring the Skies above Australia, New Zealand and South Africa. Glasgow, UK: Collins. ISBN 978-0-00-846980-1.
- Dunlop, Storm; Tirion, Wil (2021). Night Sky Almanac 2022. Glasgow, UK: Collins. ISBN 978-0-00-846988-7.
