= List of stars in Lacerta =

This is the list of notable stars in the constellation Lacerta, sorted by decreasing brightness.

Name	B	F	Var	HD	HIP	RA	Dec	vis. mag.	abs. mag.	Dist. (ly)	Sp. class	Notes
α Lac	α	7		213558	111169	22^{h} 31^{m} 17.38^{s}	+50° 16′ 56.8″	3.76	1.28	102	A1V	Stellio
1 Lac		1		211388	109937	22^{h} 15^{m} 58.17^{s}	+37° 44′ 55.4″	4.14	−2.28	627	K3III	suspected variable
5 Lac		5	V412	213310	111022	22^{h} 29^{m} 31.82^{s}	+47° 42′ 24.8″	4.34	−3.42	1164	M0II	slow irregular variable
β Lac	β	3		212496	110538	22^{h} 23^{m} 33.64^{s}	+52° 13′ 46.2″	4.42	0.84	170	G9III	Alsamaka
HD 211073				211073	109754	22^{h} 13^{m} 52.70^{s}	+39° 42′ 53.6″	4.50	−1.69	563	K3III	suspected variable, V_{max} = 4.49^{m}, V_{min} = 4.55^{m}
11 Lac		11		214868	111944	22^{h} 40^{m} 30.78^{s}	+44° 16′ 34.6″	4.50	−0.33	302	K3III	variable star, ΔV = 0.003^{m}, P = 17.30403 d
6 Lac		6		213420	111104	22^{h} 30^{m} 29.26^{s}	+43° 07′ 24.2″	4.52	−3.60	1370	B2IV	
2 Lac		2		212120	110351	22^{h} 21^{m} 01.53^{s}	+46° 32′ 11.6″	4.55	−1.42	509	B6V	suspected rotating ellipsoidal variable, V_{max} = 4.53^{m}, V_{min} = 4.56^{m}
4 Lac		4		212593	110609	22^{h} 24^{m} 31.00^{s}	+49° 28′ 35.0″	4.55	−4.51	2117	B9Iab	
9 Lac		9		214454	111674	22^{h} 37^{m} 22.47^{s}	+51° 32′ 43.3″	4.64	1.03	172	A8IV	
10 Lac		10		214680	111841	22^{h} 39^{m} 15.68^{s}	+39° 03′ 01.0″	4.89	−2.67	1058	O9V	Spectrum anchor point; suspected β Cep variable
15 Lac		15		216397	112917	22^{h} 52^{m} 01.95^{s}	+43° 18′ 44.5″	4.95	−0.05	326	M0III	
V424 Lac			V424	216946	113288	22^{h} 56^{m} 26.00^{s}	+49° 44′ 00.8″	4.99	−3.81	1874	K5Ibvar	Tengshe, slow irregular variable
HD 209945				209945	109102	22^{h} 06^{m} 01.96^{s}	+45° 00′ 51.8″	5.09	−1.30	619	K5III	
V416 Lac			V416	214665	111795	22^{h} 38^{m} 37.87^{s}	+56° 47′ 44.6″	5.11	−0.49	430	M4III	slow irregular variable
13 Lac		13		215373	112242	22^{h} 44^{m} 05.49^{s}	+41° 49′ 09.2″	5.11	0.49	274	K0III	
12 Lac		12	DD	214993	112031	22^{h} 41^{m} 28.65^{s}	+40° 13′ 31.7″	5.25	−2.90	1393	B2IIIv SB	β Cep and 53 Per variable, V_{max} = 5.16^{m}, V_{min} = 5.28^{m}, P = 0.1930924 d
EW Lac			EW	217050	113327	22^{h} 57^{m} 04.49^{s}	+48° 41′ 02.7″	5.34	−2.30	1098	B4IIIpe	γ Cas variable, V_{max} = 5.22^{m}, V_{min} = 5.48^{m}
HD 210715				210715	109521	22^{h} 11^{m} 09.78^{s}	+50° 49′ 23.8″	5.38	1.69	179	A5V	
HD 216174				216174	112731	22^{h} 49^{m} 46.23^{s}	+55° 54′ 09.7″	5.43	0.15	371	K1III	
HD 211096				211096	109745	22^{h} 13^{m} 49.18^{s}	+45° 26′ 26.2″	5.53	1.10	251	A0III	
16 Lac		16	EN	216916	113281	22^{h} 56^{m} 23.63^{s}	+41° 36′ 14.0″	5.60	−2.24	1203	B2IV	β Cep variable and triple star system
HD 211211				211211	109831	22^{h} 14^{m} 44.33^{s}	+42° 57′ 14.3″	5.72	1.06	279	A2Vnn	
HD 213930				213930	111362	22^{h} 33^{m} 40.57^{s}	+56° 37′ 28.7″	5.72	0.63	340	G8III-IV	slow irregular variable, V_{max} = 5.6^{m}, V_{min} = 6.8^{m}
8 Lac A		8		214167	111546	22^{h} 35^{m} 52.28^{s}	+39° 38′ 03.6″	5.73	−0.73	639	B1Ve	suspected variable, ΔV = 0.05^{m}
HD 216831				216831	113222	22^{h} 55^{m} 44.49^{s}	+36° 21′ 05.0″	5.73	−1.31	836	B7III	
HD 216608				216608	113048	22^{h} 53^{m} 40.16^{s}	+44° 44′ 57.1″	5.79	2.21	170	A3m	
HD 215943				215943	112590	22^{h} 48^{m} 11.07^{s}	+37° 25′ 00.6″	5.82	0.58	364	G8III:	suspected variable, V_{max} = 5.82^{m}, V_{min} = 6.18^{m}
HD 216646				216646	113084	22^{h} 54^{m} 06.91^{s}	+40° 22′ 36.6″	5.82	0.74	339	K0III	
HD 215664				215664	112417	22^{h} 46^{m} 10.11^{s}	+44° 32′ 45.5″	5.84	2.21	173	F0III-IV	suspected δ Sct variable, ΔV = 0.01^{m}
HD 213660				213660	111259	22^{h} 32^{m} 26.37^{s}	+39° 46′ 47.1″	5.88	−0.54	628	A6V	
14 Lac		14	V360	216200	112778	22^{h} 50^{m} 21.77^{s}	+41° 57′ 12.3″	5.91	−1.70	1087	B3IV:var	β Lyr variable, V_{max} = 5.91^{m}, V_{min} = 5.98^{m}, P = 10.075 d
HD 216756				216756	113174	22^{h} 55^{m} 02.58^{s}	+37° 04′ 36.5″	5.91	2.83	134	F5II	
HD 215030				215030	112041	22^{h} 41^{m} 35.94^{s}	+41° 32′ 56.3″	5.93	0.95	323	G9III	
HD 215359				215359	112241	22^{h} 44^{m} 05.21^{s}	+39° 27′ 55.5″	5.93	−0.56	647	K5III+...	
HD 214878				214878	111925	22^{h} 40^{m} 18.40^{s}	+53° 50′ 45.5″	5.94	0.83	344	B8V	
HD 214714				214714	111869	22^{h} 39^{m} 34.32^{s}	+37° 35′ 34.1″	6.03	−1.18	903	G3Ib-IICNe.	
AR Lac			AR	210334	109303	22^{h} 08^{m} 40.86^{s}	+45° 44′ 31.7″	6.11	2.99	137	K2III comp	RS CVn variable and prototype AR Lac variable, V_{max} = 6.08^{m}, V_{min} = 6.77^{m}, P = 1.98319204 d
HD 215159				215159	112098	22^{h} 42^{m} 20.81^{s}	+53° 54′ 31.6″	6.14	−1.67	1190	K2	
HD 216057				216057	112641	22^{h} 48^{m} 47.88^{s}	+54° 24′ 53.6″	6.14	−0.19	601	B5Vn	
HR 8421			HT	209857	109033	22^{h} 05^{m} 16.52^{s}	+46° 44′ 41.6″	6.16	−1.19	962	M4III	semiregular variable, V_{max} = 6.08^{m}, V_{min} = 6.36^{m}, P = 82 d
HD 212978				212978	110849	22^{h} 27^{m} 26.50^{s}	+39° 48′ 36.1″	6.16	−1.95	1364	B2V	
V399 Lac			V399	210221	109205	22^{h} 07^{m} 25.59^{s}	+53° 18′ 26.8″	6.17			A3Ib	α Cyg variable
HD 217101				217101	113371	22^{h} 57^{m} 40.74^{s}	+39° 18′ 31.6″	6.17	−1.94	1364	B2IV-V	
HD 212487				212487	110566	22^{h} 23^{m} 54.06^{s}	+38° 34′ 23.9″	6.18	2.59	170	F5IV:	suspected variable, ΔV = 0.4^{m}
HD 209993				209993	109121	22^{h} 06^{m} 12.25^{s}	+45° 14′ 55.3″	6.19	1.21	323	A3V	
HD 211797				211797	110171	22^{h} 18^{m} 56.17^{s}	+37° 46′ 09.0″	6.19	2.10	215	A9IIIp	
HD 216206				216206	112761	22^{h} 50^{m} 10.09^{s}	+50° 40′ 36.9″	6.23	−2.28	1638	G4Ib	
HD 209961			V365	209961	109082	22^{h} 05^{m} 51.22^{s}	+48° 13′ 53.4″	6.26	−2.64	1964	B2V SB	α^{2} CVn variable, ΔV = 0.08^{m}, P = 1.08635 d
HD 214313				214313	111627	22^{h} 36^{m} 48.69^{s}	+35° 39′ 08.7″	6.28	−0.38	700	K5	
HD 214240				214240	111550	22^{h} 35^{m} 53.38^{s}	+50° 04′ 14.8″	6.29	−2.24	1655	B3V	suspected variable
V377 Lac			V377	216538	113009	22^{h} 53^{m} 11.37^{s}	+40° 10′ 02.6″	6.33	−1.62	1268	B7III-IV	53 Per variable, V_{max} = 6.33^{m}, V_{min} = 6.35^{m}, P = 2.6217 d
HD 214279				214279	111543	22^{h} 35^{m} 51.98^{s}	+56° 04′ 14.1″	6.37	1.21	351	A3V	
V405 Lac			V405	212222	110408	22^{h} 21^{m} 50.86^{s}	+42° 04′ 41.4″	6.38	−0.33	715	B5V	53 Per variable
HD 214558				214558	111753	22^{h} 38^{m} 17.41^{s}	+45° 10′ 58.6″	6.38	0.36	522	G2III+...	
HD 215242				215242	112170	22^{h} 43^{m} 04.32^{s}	+47° 10′ 07.5″	6.39	−3.89	3705	A1V+...	
HD 212071				212071	110316	22^{h} 20^{m} 39.52^{s}	+50° 58′ 50.9″	6.40	−2.12	1646	K2	variable star, ΔV = 0.007^{m}, P = 7.92959 d
HD 210289				210289	109272	22^{h} 08^{m} 16.28^{s}	+49° 47′ 49.2″	6.41	−1.26	1113	K5III	
V350 Lac			V350	213389	111072	22^{h} 30^{m} 06.53^{s}	+49° 21′ 23.3″	6.41	0.97	399	K2III SB	RS CVn and rotating ellipsoidal variable, V_{max} = 6.27^{m}, V_{min} = 6.47^{m}, P = 17.748 d
HD 213720				213720	111247	22^{h} 32^{m} 18.69^{s}	+54° 02′ 13.2″	6.41	−0.03	633	G8III	
HD 215191				215191	112144	22^{h} 42^{m} 55.45^{s}	+37° 48′ 09.9″	6.43	−1.41	1203	B1V	
HD 215518				215518	112300	22^{h} 44^{m} 49.12^{s}	+52° 31′ 01.9″	6.43	−0.90	953	K2	
HD 212334				212334	110487	22^{h} 22^{m} 50.28^{s}	+36° 39′ 32.1″	6.45	0.82	436	K0	
HD 211660				211660	110055	22^{h} 17^{m} 28.31^{s}	+49° 07′ 37.0″	6.46	−0.74	898	K0	
HD 212883				212883	110790	22^{h} 26^{m} 45.56^{s}	+37° 26′ 37.4″	6.46	−2.40	1929	B2V	
HD 216523				216523	112986	22^{h} 52^{m} 52.23^{s}	+50° 24′ 44.2″	6.46	−0.47	791	B8V	suspected variable
HD 215473				215473	112305	22^{h} 44^{m} 52.97^{s}	+39° 12′ 03.9″	6.47	−0.17	695	K5	
HD 209932				209932	109079	22^{h} 05^{m} 50.44^{s}	+45° 06′ 45.0″	6.50	−0.15	698	A0V	suspected variable
8 Lac B		8		214168	111544	22^{h} 35^{m} 52.10^{s}	+39° 37′ 41.4″	6.60	2.16	252	B2V	
HK Lac			HK	209813	109002	22^{h} 04^{m} 56.61^{s}	+47° 14′ 04.5″	6.96		531	K0III	RS CVn variable, V_{max} = 6.77^{m}, V_{min} = 7.04^{m}, P = 25.83 d
S Lac			S	213191	110972	22^{h} 29^{m} 00.91^{s}	+40° 18′ 55.8″	7.60		1640	M4-6.5e	Mira variable, V_{max} = 7.6^{m}, V_{min} = 13.9^{m}, P = 241.5 d
CM Lac			CM	209147	108606	22^{h} 00^{m} 04.45^{s}	+44° 33′ 07.7″	8.21		741	A3m	Algol variable, V_{max} = 8.18^{m}, V_{min} = 9.15^{m}, P = 1.6046916 d
EV Lac			EV		112460	22^{h} 46^{m} 49.73^{s}	+44° 20′ 02.4″	8.28		16.699	M4.5V	flare star and BY Dra variable
V364 Lac			V364	216429	112928	22^{h} 52^{m} 40.81^{s}	+38° 44′ 44.6″	8.36		1410	A3	Algol variable
X Lac			X	216105	112675	22^{h} 49^{m} 03.18^{s}	+56° 25′ 41.5″	8.42		3900	G5	Classical Cepheid, V_{max} = 8.2^{m}, V_{min} = 8.64^{m}, P = 5.44499 d
SW Lac			SW	216598	113052	22^{h} 53^{m} 41.66^{s}	+37° 56′ 18.6″	8.51		236.4	K0Vv	W UMa variable, V_{max} = 8.51^{m}, V_{min} = 9.49^{m}, P = 0.3207152 d
Z Lac			Z	214975	111972	22^{h} 40^{m} 52.15^{s}	+56° 49′ 46.1″	8.57		1730	F6Ib...	Classical Cepheid, V_{max} = 7.88^{m}, V_{min} = 8.93^{m}, P = 10.885613 d
SAO 51891			V383			22^{h} 20^{m} 07.03^{s}	+49° 30′ 11.8″	8.57			K1V	flare star and BY Dra variable, V_{max} = 8.495^{m}, V_{min} = 8.569^{m}, P = 2.62 d
BG Lac			BG		108630	22^{h} 00^{m} 25.14^{s}	+43° 26′ 43.3″	8.59			G0.7	Classical Cepheid, V_{max} = 8.51^{m}, V_{min} = 9.18^{m}, P = 5.331908 d
HD 213918			V362	213918	111400	22^{h} 34^{m} 07.28^{s}	+39° 20′ 07.9″	8.68			Ap	α^{2} CVn variable, ΔV = 0.07^{m}, P = 1.43 d
HD 215441			GL	215441	112247	22^{h} 44^{m} 07.51^{s}	+55° 35′ 21.2″	8.81		5100	A0p	Babcock's star; α^{2} CVn variable, V_{max} = 8.73^{m}, V_{min} = 8.9^{m}, P = 9.4871 d
RT Lac			RT	209318	108728	22^{h} 01^{m} 30.74^{s}	+43° 53′ 25.6″	8.84		825	G9+K1IVIV	RS CVn variable, V_{max} = 8.84^{m}, V_{min} = 9.89^{m}, P = 5.0739496 d
RR Lac			RR	240024	112026	22^{h} 41^{m} 26.53^{s}	+56° 25′ 58.0″	8.87		2090	K0	Classical Cepheid, V_{max} = 8.38^{m}, V_{min} = 9.3^{m}, P = 6.416243 d
V Lac			V	240073	112626	22^{h} 48^{m} 38.00^{s}	+56° 19′ 17.5″	8.89			G5	Classical Cepheid, V_{max} = 8.38^{m}, V_{min} = 9.42^{m}, P = 4.983458 d
IRAS 22272+5435			V354	235858		22^{h} 29^{m} 10.37^{s}	+54° 51′ 06.4″	9.00			G5Ia	protoplanetary nebula, ΔV = 0.49^{m}, P = 130 d
Y Lac			Y	235739	109340	22^{h} 09^{m} 02.90^{s}	+51° 02′ 45.1″	9.13	-3.2 ± 0.2	8500 ± 800	F8	Classical Cepheid, V_{max} = 8.76^{m}, V_{min} = 9.5^{m}, P = 4.323776 d
HD 216536				216536		22^{h} 53^{m} 03.97^{s}	+44° 28′ 40″	9.23			K0	has a planet (b)
U Lac			U	215924	112545	22^{h} 47^{m} 43.43^{s}	+55° 09′ 30.3″	9.40		2880	M4Iab:e	semiregular variable
IRAS 22223+4327			V448			22^{h} 24^{m} 31.43^{s}	+43° 43′ 10.9″	9.69			F9Ia	protoplanetary nebula, ΔV = 0.21^{m}, P = 89 d
ADS 16402 A						22^{h} 57^{m} 45.9211^{s}	+38° 40′ 27.200″	10.0	3.4	523	F8 / G0V	component of the ADS 16402 binary star system;
ADS 16402 B						22^{h} 57^{m} 46.83^{s}	+38° 40′ 29.8″	10.4	3.7	522	F8 / G0V	component of the ADS 16402 binary star system; has the transiting planet HAT-P-1b
SS Lac			SS		108981	22^{h} 04^{m} 41.55^{s}	+46° 25′ 38.1″	10.12		3300	B9V	Algol variable
VY Lac			VY	216160		22^{h} 49^{m} 59.13^{s}	+49° 00′ 16.0″	10.13			A2	Beta Lyrae variable
CO Lac			CO	240058	112436	22^{h} 46^{m} 30.00^{s}	+56° 49′ 31.6″	10.40			B9V	Algol variable, V_{max} = 10.28^{m}, V_{min} = 10.89^{m}, P = 1.5422075 d
DE Lac			DE		109420	22^{h} 10^{m} 07.77^{s}	+40° 55′ 10.6″	10.43		2490	F6.5	δ Sct variable, V_{max} = 10.08^{m}, V_{min} = 10.43^{m}, P = 0.2536934 d
VX Lac			VX			22^{h} 41^{m} 00.56^{s}	+38° 19′ 20.0″	10.51			F0	Algol variable
CZ Lac			CZ		110213	22^{h} 19^{m} 30.77^{s}	+51° 28′ 14.9″	10.77			F1	RR Lyr variable, V_{max} = 10.77^{m}, V_{min} = 11.26^{m}, P = 0.432205 d
RW Lac			RW			22^{h} 44^{m} 57.10^{s}	+49° 39′ 27.6″	10.81			F2	Algol variable
AW Lac			AW			22^{h} 17^{m} 57.89^{s}	+54° 28′ 02.3″	10.95			B2	Beta Lyrae variable
V345 Lac			V345			22^{h} 18^{m} 43.34^{s}	+54° 40′ 33.4″	11.32			B5	Algol variable
HAT-P-40						22^{h} 22^{m} 03.0^{s}	+45° 27′ 27″	11.7		1634		Taika; has a transiting planet (b)
PP Lac			PP			22^{h} 42^{m} 38.66^{s}	+53° 25′ 02.8″	11.85			G5	W UMa variable
DI Lac			DI	214239		22^{h} 35^{m} 48.48^{s}	+52° 42′ 59.7″	14.9			sd:Be+...	nova
CP Lac			CP			22^{h} 15^{m} 41.09^{s}	+55° 37′ 01.4″	17.7			G5	nova, V_{max} = 2.0^{m}, V_{min} = 17.7^{m}
DK Lac			DK			22^{h} 49^{m} 46.91^{s}	+51° 17′ 19.3″	19.4				nova
DK Lac			DK			22^{h} 2^{m} 19.94^{s}	+38° 1′ 26.78″	9.112				nova
PSR B2217+47						22^{h} 19^{m} 48.14^{s}	+47° 54′ 53.9″					pulsar
Table legend: • Name = Proper name • B = Bayer designation • F or/and G. = Flamsteed designation or Gould designation • Var = Variable-star designation • HD = Henry Draper Catalogue designation number • HIP = Hipparcos Catalogue designation number • RA = Right ascension for the Epoch/Equinox J2000.0 • Dec = Declination for the Epoch/Equinox J2000.0 • vis. mag. = visual magnitude (m or m_{v}), also known as apparent magnitude • abs. mag. = absolute magnitude (M_{v}) • Dist. (ly) = Distance in light-years from Earth • Sp. class = Spectral class of the star in the stellar classification system • Notes = Common name(s) or alternate name(s); comments; notable properties [for example: multiple star status, range of variability if it is a variable star, exoplanets, etc.]

== See also ==
- List of stars by constellation
