= Lacerta in Chinese astronomy =

According to traditional Chinese uranography, the modern constellation Lacerta is located within the northern quadrant of the sky, which is symbolized as the Black Tortoise of the North (北方玄武, Běi Fāng Xuán Wǔ).

The name of the western constellation in modern Chinese is 蝎虎座 (xiē hǔ zuò), meaning "the lizard constellation".

== Stars ==
The map of Chinese constellation in constellation Lacerta area consists of :

Four Symbols	Mansion (Chinese name)	Romanization	Translation	Asterisms (Chinese name)	Romanization	Translation	Western star name	Proper Name	Chinese star name	Romanization	Translation
Black Tortoise of the North (北方玄武)	危	Wēi	Rooftop								
Black Tortoise of the North (北方玄武)	危	Wēi	Rooftop	杵	Chǔ	Pestle	1 Lac		杵一	Chǔyī	1st star
Black Tortoise of the North (北方玄武)	危	Wēi	Rooftop	車府	Chēfǔ	Big Yard for Chariots					
Black Tortoise of the North (北方玄武)	危	Wēi	Rooftop	車府	Chēfǔ	Big Yard for Chariots	15 Lac		車府一	Chēfǔyī	1st star
Black Tortoise of the North (北方玄武)	危	Wēi	Rooftop	車府	Chēfǔ	Big Yard for Chariots	11 Lac		車府二	Chēfǔèr	2nd star
Black Tortoise of the North (北方玄武)	危	Wēi	Rooftop	車府	Chēfǔ	Big Yard for Chariots	2 Lac		車府三	Chēfǔsān	3rd star
Black Tortoise of the North (北方玄武)	危	Wēi	Rooftop	車府	Chēfǔ	Big Yard for Chariots	6 Lac		車府增九	Chēfǔzēngjiǔ	9th additional star
Black Tortoise of the North (北方玄武)	危	Wēi	Rooftop	車府	Chēfǔ	Big Yard for Chariots	8 Lac		車府增十	Chēfǔzēngshí	10th additional star
Black Tortoise of the North (北方玄武)	危	Wēi	Rooftop	車府	Chēfǔ	Big Yard for Chariots	10 Lac		車府增十一	Chēfǔzēngshíyī	11th additional star
Black Tortoise of the North (北方玄武)	危	Wēi	Rooftop	車府	Chēfǔ	Big Yard for Chariots	12 Lac		車府增十二	Chēfǔzēngshíèr	12th additional star
Black Tortoise of the North (北方玄武)	危	Wēi	Rooftop	車府	Chēfǔ	Big Yard for Chariots	13 Lac		車府增十三	Chēfǔzēngshísān	13th additional star
Black Tortoise of the North (北方玄武)	危	Wēi	Rooftop	車府	Chēfǔ	Big Yard for Chariots	14 Lac		車府增十四	Chēfǔzēngshísì	14th additional star
Black Tortoise of the North (北方玄武)	危	Wēi	Rooftop	車府	Chēfǔ	Big Yard for Chariots	16 Lac		車府增十五	Chēfǔzēngshíwǔ	15th additional star
Black Tortoise of the North (北方玄武)	危	Wēi	Rooftop	車府	Chēfǔ	Big Yard for Chariots	5 Lac		車府增十九	Chēfǔzēngshíjiǔ	19th additional star
Black Tortoise of the North (北方玄武)	室	Shì	Encampment	騰蛇	Téngshé	Flying Serpent					
Black Tortoise of the North (北方玄武)	室	Shì	Encampment	騰蛇	Téngshé	Flying Serpent	α Lac	Stellio	螣蛇一	Téngshéyī	1st star
Black Tortoise of the North (北方玄武)	室	Shì	Encampment	騰蛇	Téngshé	Flying Serpent	4 Lac		螣蛇二	Téngshéèr	2nd star
Black Tortoise of the North (北方玄武)	室	Shì	Encampment	騰蛇	Téngshé	Flying Serpent	β Lac	Alsamaka	螣蛇十	Téngshéshí	10th star
Black Tortoise of the North (北方玄武)	室	Shì	Encampment	騰蛇	Téngshé	Flying Serpent	9 Lac		螣蛇十五	Téngshéshíwu	15th star

== See also ==
- Traditional Chinese star names
- Chinese constellations
