= Tengshe =

Tengshe may refer to:

- Teng (mythology), a Chinese mythological dragon or serpent
- Flying Serpent or Tengshe, a Chinese constellation
- The proper name of the star V424 Lacertae
