= MWC 656 =

X-ray binary system in the constellation Lacerta

Observation data Epoch J2000.0 Equinox ICRS
- Constellation: Lacerta
- Right ascension: 22^{h} 42^{m} 57.303^{s}
- Declination: +44° 43′ 18.26″
- Apparent magnitude (V): 8.75

Characteristics
- Spectral type: B1.5-2III or B5:ne
- U−B color index: −0.77
- B−V color index: 0.090±0.015

Astrometry
| Proper motion (μ) | RA: −3.478 mas/yr Dec.: −3.159 mas/yr |
| Parallax (π) | 0.4860±0.0185 mas |
| Distance | 6,700 ± 300 ly (2,060 ± 80 pc) |

Orbit
| Period (P) | 59.028±0.011 d |
| Eccentricity (e) | 0 (fixed) |
| Periastron epoch (T) | 2,457,509.20±0.31 BJD |
| Argument of periastron (ω) (secondary) | 90 (fixed)° |
| Semi-amplitude (K_{1}) (primary) | 11.6±3.7 km/s |
| Semi-amplitude (K_{2}) (secondary) | 91.2±2.9 km/s |

Details

Primary
| Mass | 7.8±2.0 M_{☉} |
| Radius | 8.8±0.5 R_{☉} |
| Surface gravity (log g) | 2.941 cgs |
| Temperature | 5,782 K |
| Rotation | 1.12±0.03 d |
| Rotational velocity (v sin i) | 305 km/s |

Secondary
| Mass | 0.94±0.34 M_{☉} |

Other designations
- AGL J2241+4454, BD+43°4279, HD 215227, HIP 112148, SAO 52294, PPM 63303, WDS J22430+4443A

Database references
| SIMBAD | data |

MWC 656 is an X-ray binary star system in the northern constellation of Lacerta. It has the identifier HD 215227 from the Henry Draper Catalogue. With an apparent visual magnitude of 8.75, it is too faint to be viewed with the naked eye. Based on parallax measurements, it is located at a distance of approximately 6,700 light years from the Sun. At one time it was considered a member of the Lacerta OB1 association of co-moving stars, but the distance estimate places it well past that group.

== Observations ==
On August 11, 1935, R. F. Sanford found a weak emission line of Hydrogen–β in the spectrum of this star, and it was included in the 1943 supplement to the Mount Wilson catalogue of similar stars with the identifier MWC 656. In 1964, it was assigned a stellar classification of B5:ne, where 'B5' indicates this is a B-type star, 'n' means it displays 'nebular' lines due to rapid rotation, and 'e' shows it has emission lines. The ':' suffix indicates some uncertainty about the classification. It was included in a catalogue of Be stars in 1982. In 2005 it was found to have high projected rotational velocity of 305 km/s.

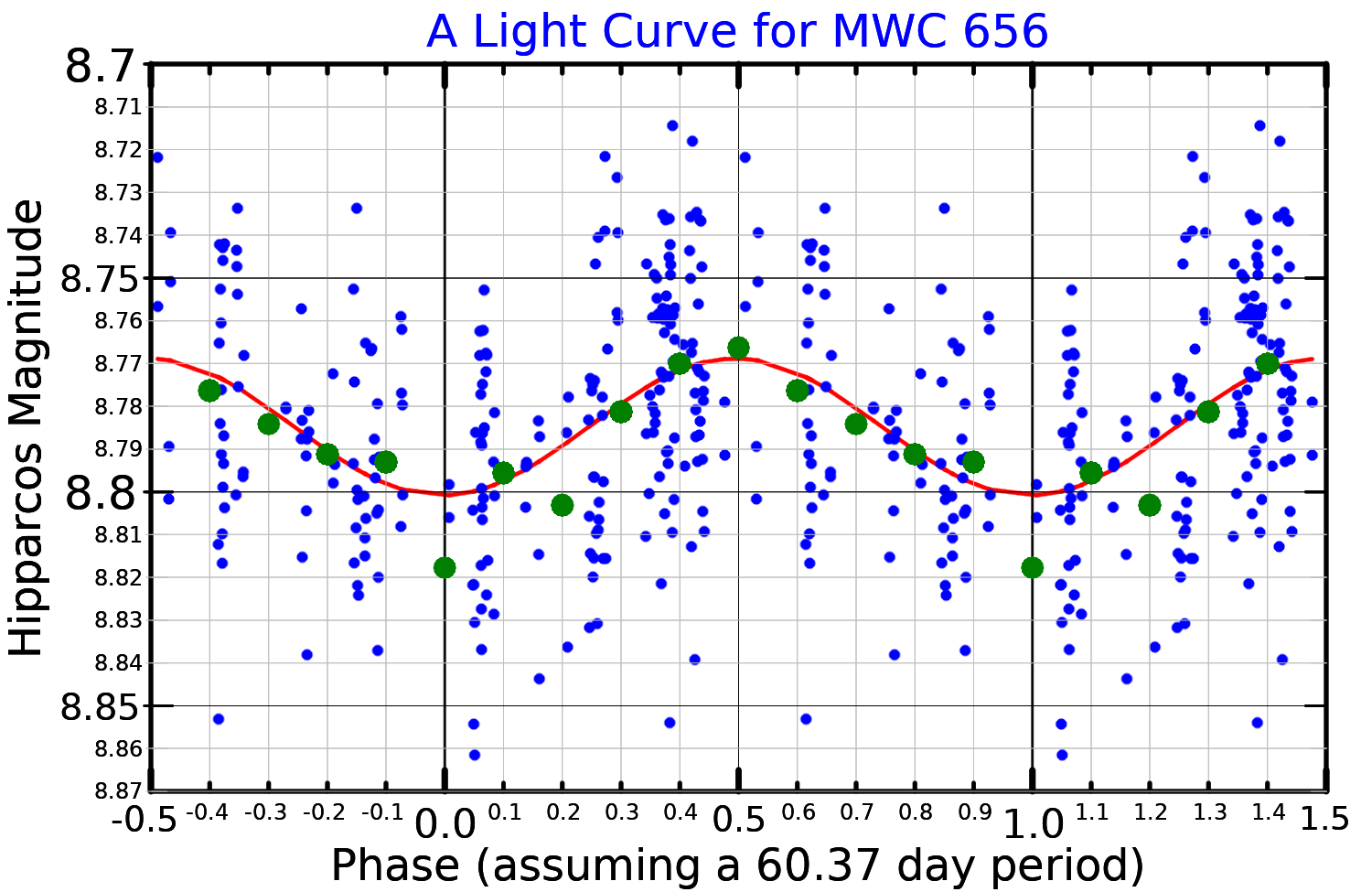
A light curve for MWC 656. The blue points show the Hipparcos data. The red curve shows a sine function fit to that data, and the green points show the averages of the data within 10 bins across each period.

In 2009, the AGILE satellite discovered a nearby source of gamma-ray emission above 100 MeV. This source was given the identifier AGL J2241+4454. HD 215227 is the only suitable optical counterpart to lay within the 0.6° error circle. Spectra from the star showed evidence of emission from a circumstellar disk, as well as absorption from a shell feature. Rapid changes in emission line variability suggest an orbiting companion that is tidally interacting with the disk. Hipparcos light curve data indicated an orbital period of 60.37±0.04 d. This was confirmed in 2012 via radial velocity measurements of helium lines in photosphere of the Be star.

Refined radial velocity measurements in 2014 indicated a massive companion in the range of 3.8–6.9 M_{☉}, assuming the Be star has a mass of 10–16 M_{☉}. A main sequence companion with a mass this high should be readily visible in the optical band. Likewise, a subdwarf or a stripped helium core from a massive progenitor star don't fit the observations. The mass is too high for a white dwarf or a neutron star, leaving a stellar mass black hole as the only viable candidate. A faint X-ray emission was detected later the same year with a total luminosity of (3.7±1.7)×10^{31} erg·s^{−1}, making this a high mass X-ray binary system. This luminosity is consistent with a stellar black hole in quiescence – meaning very little material is being fed into the black hole from the primary star.

This was the first reported binary system combining a black hole with a Be star. However, many Be stars are now found to have subdwarf OC companions, and the properties of these appear similar to MWC 656. The 2022 discovery of tidal distortion of the disk orbiting the Be star invalidated the original radial velocity amplitude, which called into question the 2014 mass estimates. The correction for this probably rules out a black hole companion. Emission from ionized helium near the companion appears double-peaked, indicating there is an orbiting accretion disk being fed from the disk orbiting the Be star. Revised measurements reported in 2023 found a mass range of 0.94 to 2.4 M_{☉} for the companion, which means this is instead a neutron star, a white dwarf, or a hot helium star.

The position of the star at a distance of 2,300 light-years (0.71 kpc) below the galactic plane suggests this is a runaway star system, since it is a young star not located near any star forming region. This scenario favors the neutron star companion.
