= Lacerta OB1 =

OB association in the constellation Lacerta

The Lacerta OB1 region is a collection of faint nebular filaments and young, hot stars grouped into an OB association, known as Lacerta OB1; the system is named after the constellation in which it is visible, that of Lacerta.

With a distance of just 370 parsecs (1,200 light-years), Lacerta OB1 appears as one of the closest OB associations to the Solar System, along with the local associations Scorpius–Centaurus, Perseus OB3, and Vela OB2; these, along with others at slightly greater distances, form the Gould Belt, a bright ring of young, massive stars developing along an immense expanding ring of gas known as the Lindblad Ring.

Lacerta OB1 is an excellent example of a young, relatively compact stellar association where star formation processes are nearing complete exhaustion; its proximity and position far from the galactic plane and its sources of disturbance due to the overlap of multiple structures along the same line of sight make it an easily studied research field.

== Observation ==
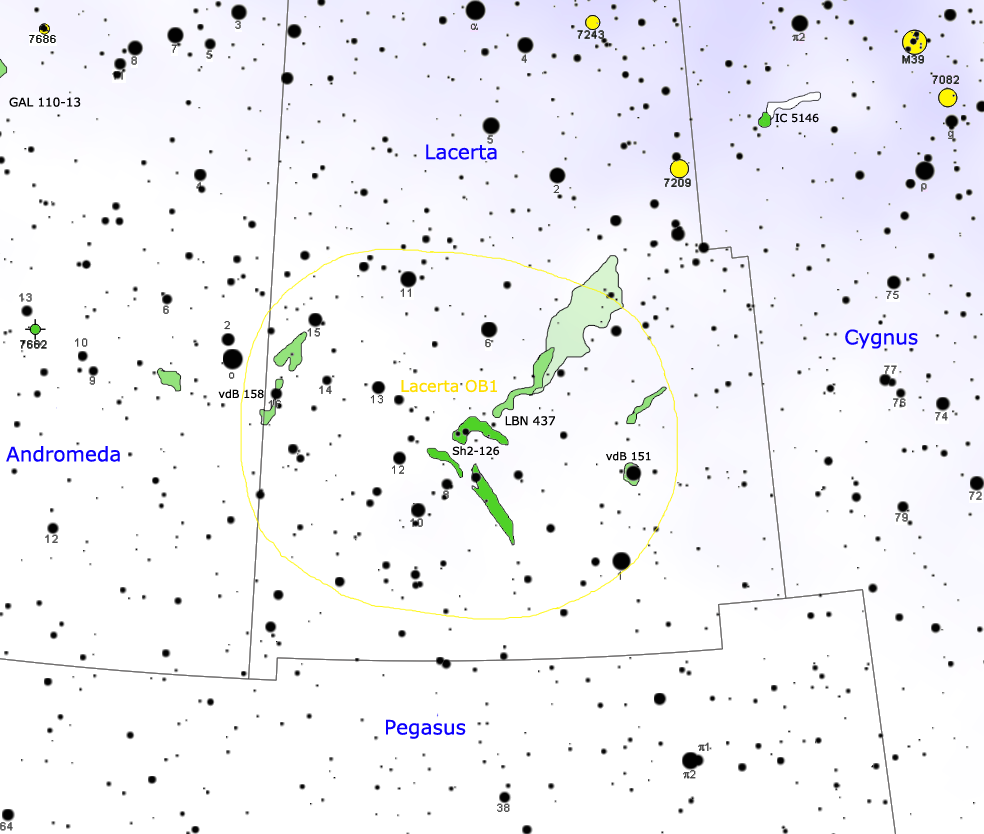
Map of the Lacerta OB1 region.

The Lac OB1 association region extends across the southern part of its host constellation, partially spilling into the neighboring constellation of Andromeda, in an area of the sky that is little-known and rarely explored by amateurs due to its faintness and lack of easily observable objects; in amateur observations, only the stellar components are directly visible: the association's stars have an apparent magnitude ranging from fourth to ninth magnitude. The brightest components are easily distinguishable even with the naked eye on a particularly dark night and are recognized as members due to their markedly bluish color; this handful of stars observable without instruments, about a dozen or slightly more, show almost no concentration, appearing instead scattered among the surrounding star fields.

The brightest component is 6 Lacertae, with a magnitude of 4.51, followed by 10 Lacertae, with a magnitude of 4.88, and other stars of fifth magnitude. With binoculars, the number of bluish components increases significantly, while a slight concentration of sixth- and seventh-magnitude stars becomes evident, scattered within a radius of several degrees around 10 Lacertae. No trace of nebulosity appears either with binoculars or a small telescope.

The nebular filaments, mostly dark or faintly luminous, are evident only in long-exposure astronomical photographs and are also concentrated around the star 10 Lacertae; some filaments appear illuminated by nearby stars, as in the case of vdB 158, visible several degrees northeast of 2 Andromedae.

The declination of this region is strongly northern; this allows for easy observation especially from terrestrial regions north of the equator, while from the Southern Hemisphere visibility is limited to tropical and subtropical regions. The best period for evening observation falls in the autumn months for the Northern Hemisphere, although it is easily locatable throughout the period from August to January.

== Characteristics and structure ==
The Lacerta OB1 association region encompasses several non-illuminated clouds with emissions visible in the CO band, masses of ionized and luminous gas, and small reflection nebulae linked to massive stars. Despite the presence of massive stars, the quantity of nebular clouds is relatively limited compared to similar regions where young, massive stars are accompanied by substantial gas. The region contains only two clouds showing evidence of recent star formation: the westernmost, located near the association's most massive star, is designated LBN 437, while the second, positioned somewhat isolated to the northeast, exhibits a cometary appearance and is cataloged as GAL 110-13. Both clouds are remnants of the large molecular cloud from which the association formed. The OB association is further divided into two subgroups, Lac OB1a and Lac OB1b, distinguished by the proper motion and radial velocity of their components.

LBN 437 is the central nebula of the region, located on the southeastern edge of a long CO-emitting cloud extending northwest, known as Kh 149, and near the nebula Sh2-126. The latter, also cataloged as LBN 428, is ionized and illuminated by the star 10 Lacertae. The densest part of LBN 437, designated as section A, is associated with several young, luminous stars, notably LkHα 233, also known by its variable star designation V375 Lacertae. This is a young Herbig Ae/Be star of thirteenth magnitude with strong H-alpha emissions. This star is the primary source exciting several bipolar Herbig-Haro objects, including the prominent HH 398 and the series HH 808 to HH 814, all concentrated within a few arcminutes. Their average physical sizes span several parsecs, with some, like HH 813 and HH 814, exhibiting bow shocks. The region also hosts an infrared source, IRAS 22317+4024.

The area around this nebula is rich in pre-main-sequence stars, including others with strong Hα emissions, such as LkHα 230, 231, and 232. Additional young stars, including five T Tauri stars, are located between the cloud and 10 Lacertae, forming a small association spanning 24 arcminutes, equivalent to about 2.6 parsecs. The formation of this group was triggered by compression from the intense ultraviolet radiation of the giant star 10 Lacertae, which impacted and shaped a pre-existing molecular cloud, causing it to collapse in multiple areas to form new stars.

GAL 110-13 is the most peripheral cloud in the region, located several degrees northeast of the association’s center, falling within the constellation Andromeda. Its membership in the system is supported by its distance of approximately 440 parsecs, consistent with that of Lac OB1. Its gases are illuminated by several massive stars with shared proper motion, cataloged as HD 222142, HD 222046, and HD 222086, which also directly illuminate the reflection nebula vdB 158, a section of the cloud itself. The cloud exhibits clear signs of intense star formation, likely triggered by the collision of two clouds. However, its cometary shape, with the coma elongated opposite the association’s center (particularly 10 Lacertae), suggests that star formation may also have been influenced by a supernova explosion from one of Lac OB1’s massive members, combined with the stellar wind of the system’s most massive components, which also shaped GAL 110-13. The supernova event is further supported by the presence of runaway stars observed in the association’s vicinity.

Distance estimates for the region range from 600 parsecs to 370 parsecs; the latter is generally the most accepted value in the scientific community. However, a 2009 study analyzing the proper motion of 12 association components proposes a distance of 520±20 parsecs, significantly higher than measurements based on parallax data from the Hipparcos satellite.

== Stellar components and evolution ==
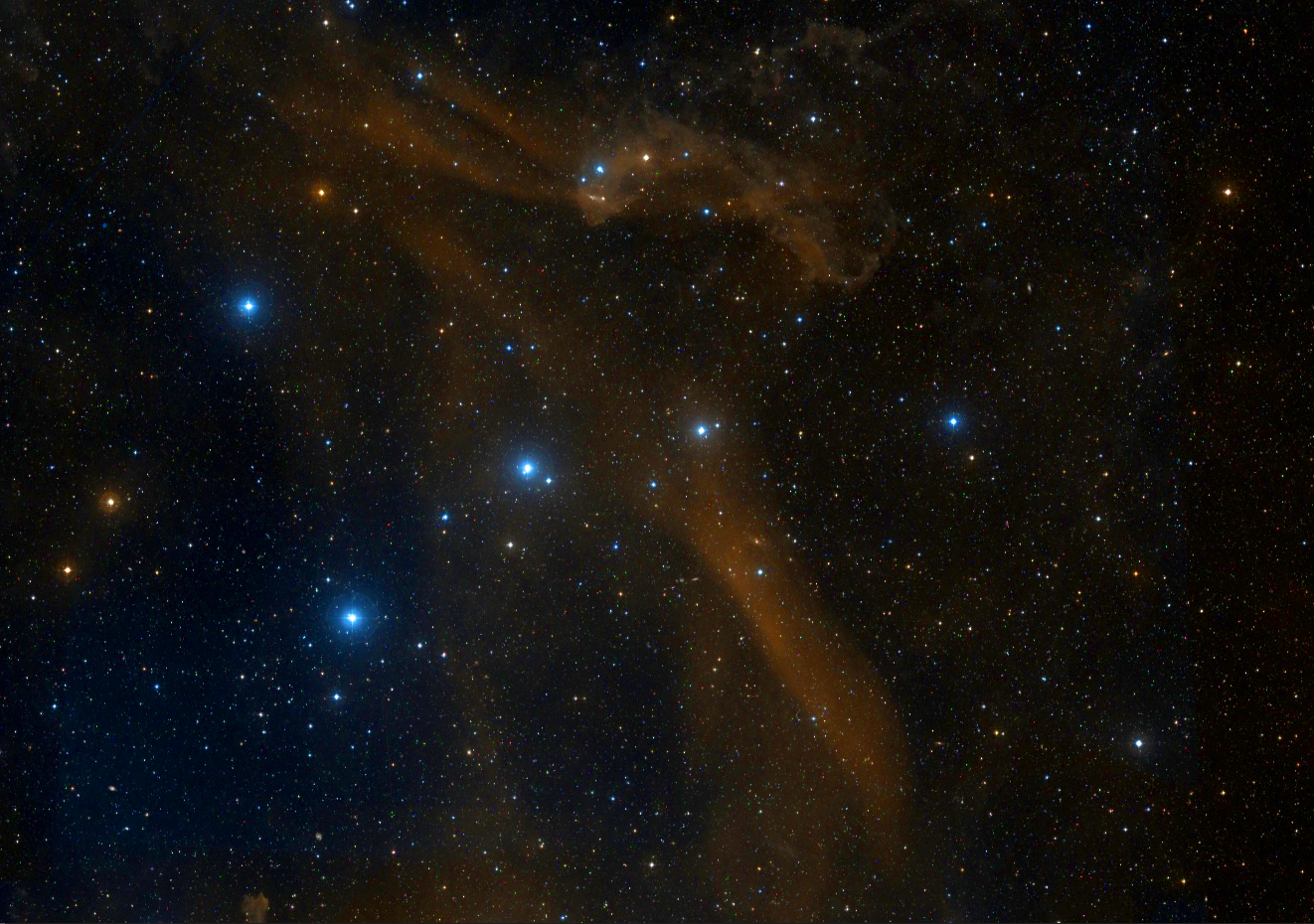
The Sh2-126 cloud, centrally located near the bright 10 Lacertae.

The Lacerta OB1 association consists of two subgroups distinguished by age, proper motion, and radial velocity of their components. The subgroup Lac OB1a occupies the eastern part of the association and comprises about fifteen massive stars aged between 16 and 25 million years; this subgroup appears highly dispersed, with its components extending northeast relative to the association's core, toward the GAL 110-13 cloud. Lac OB1a totals 51 members, including 9 of spectral class O and B (massive stars) and 42 of lower spectral classes (main-sequence white and white-yellow stars); some of the more massive components have already departed the main sequence due to advanced evolution.

The subgroup Lac OB1b occupies the southwestern part of the association, spans about 5°, and is younger than Lac OB1a, with ages around 12–16 million years; it comprises 45 stars, of which 27 are massive O and B class, with the remainder of intermediate mass.

Overall, the association hosts one O-class star (10 Lacertae), 35 B-class, 46 A-class, one F-class, 8 K-class, and 3 M-class, plus the carbon star HD 222241 (HIP 116681), located at the border between Andromeda and Pegasus, and one star of undetermined spectral class, HIP 111762. The dominant components, easily visible to the naked eye, include, besides 10 Lacertae, 12 Lacertae, a Beta Cephei variable with an average magnitude of 5.25, and 16 Lacertae, another Beta Cepheid at magnitude 5.60.

The star formation processes generating the association occurred at distinct times, with the most recent only a few million years ago. Initial phenomena likely took place in an isolated giant molecular cloud; the birth of the first massive stars would have generated an ionization front impacting distant cloud fragments, initiating secondary generative processes. Some researchers suspect that Lac OB1a may not be a true stellar group, as it should contain pre-main-sequence stars if real; young stars in its direction are indeed found toward GAL 110-13, where star formation was triggered by violent events such as a supernova explosion or cloud collision.

== See also ==
- OB association
- H II region

== Bibliography ==
=== General texts ===
- O'Meara, Stephen James (2007). Deep Sky Companions: Hidden Treasures. Cambridge University Press. ISBN 978-0-521-83704-0.
- Robert Burnham, Jr (1978). Burnham's Celestial Handbook: Volume Two. New York: Dover Publications, Inc.
- Thomas T. Arny (2007). Explorations: An Introduction to Astronomy (3 updated ed.). Boston: McGraw-Hill. ISBN 978-0-07-321369-9.
- The Universe - Great Encyclopedia of Astronomy. Novara: De Agostini. 2002.
- Gribbin, J. (2005). Encyclopedia of Astronomy and Cosmology. Milan: Garzanti. ISBN 88-11-50517-8.
- Owen, W. (2006). Illustrated Atlas of the Universe. Milan: Il Viaggiatore. ISBN 88-365-3679-4.

=== Specific texts ===
==== On stellar evolution ====
- Lada, C. J.; N. D. Kylafits (1999). The Origin of Stars and Planetary Systems. Kluwer Academic Publishers. ISBN 0-7923-5909-7.
- De Blasi, A. (2002). The Stars: Birth, Evolution and Death. Bologna: CLUEB. ISBN 88-491-1832-5.
- Abbondi, C. (2007). Universe in Evolution from the Birth to the Death of Stars. Sandit. ISBN 978-88-89150-32-0.

==== On the Lacerta OB1 association ====
- Chen, W. P.; Lee, H. T. (December 2008). "The Lacerta OB1 Association". Handbook of Star Forming Regions, Volume I: The Northern Sky. Vol. 4. p. 124. Bibcode:2008hsf1.book..124C.

=== Star charts ===
- Toshimi Taki (2005). "Taki's 8.5 Magnitude Star Atlas". Archived from the original on November 5, 2018. – Freely downloadable celestial atlas in PDF format.
- Tirion; Rappaport; Lovi (1987). Uranometria 2000.0 - Volume I - The Northern Hemisphere to -6°. Richmond, Virginia, USA: Willmann-Bell, inc. ISBN 0-943396-14-X.
- Tirion; Sinnott (1998). Sky Atlas 2000.0 (2 ed.). Cambridge, USA: Cambridge University Press. ISBN 0-933346-90-5.
- Tirion (2001). The Cambridge Star Atlas 2000.0 (3 ed.). Cambridge, USA: Cambridge University Press. ISBN 0-521-80084-6.
