= CP Lacertae =

1936 Nova seen in the constellation Lacerta

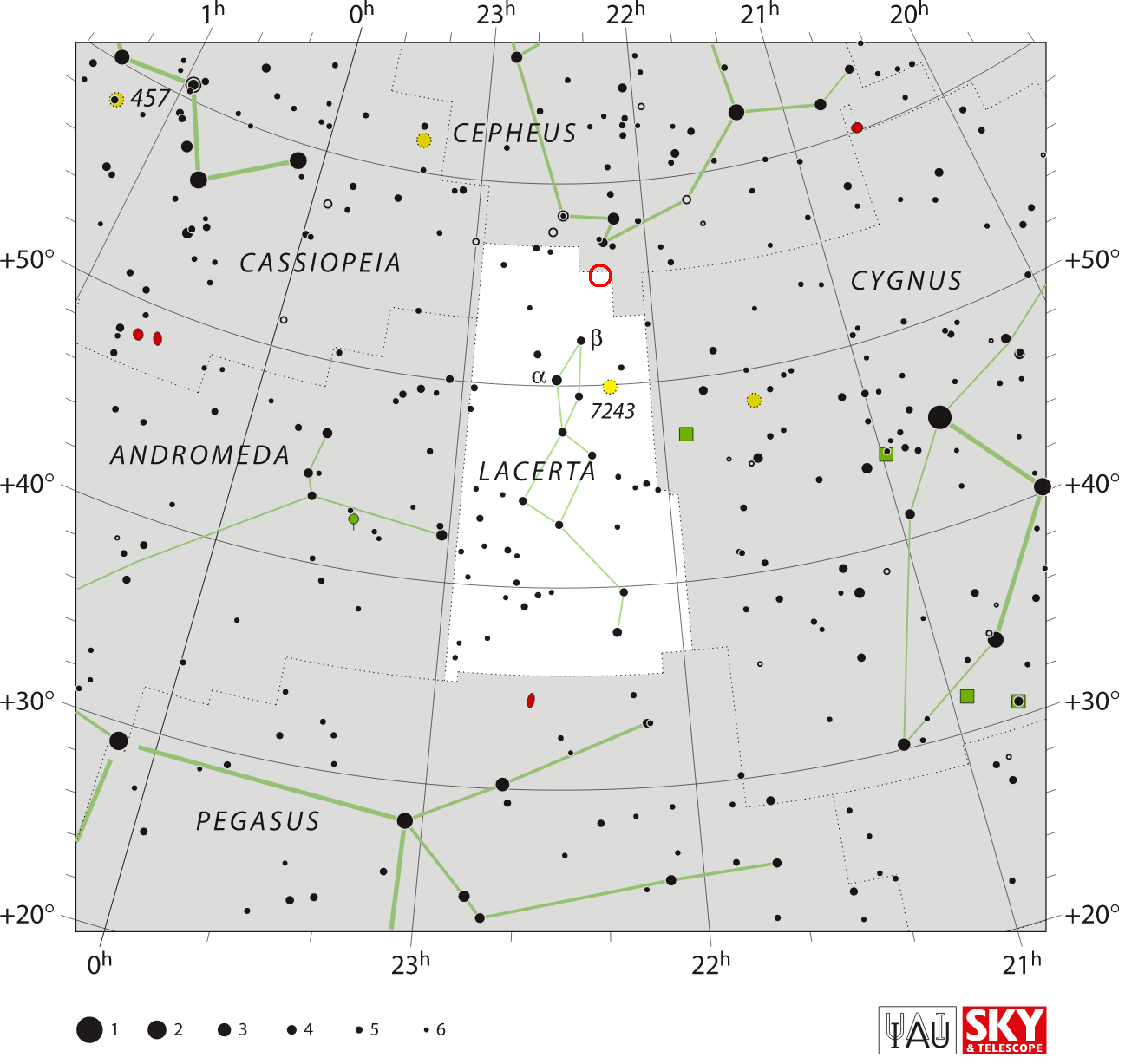
- Location of CP Lacertae (circled in red)

Observation data Epoch J2000.0 Equinox J2000.0 (ICRS)
- Constellation: Lacerta
- Right ascension: 22^{h} 15^{m} 41.10330^{s}
- Declination: +55° 37′ 01.3222″
- Apparent magnitude (V): 2.1 Max. 16.6 Min.

Characteristics
- Variable type: Nova

Astrometry
Proper motion (μ)	RA: −7.945±0.033 mas/yr Dec.: −3.441±0.029 mas/yr
Parallax (π)	0.8616±0.0298 mas
Distance	3,800 ± 100 ly (1,160 ± 40 pc)

Other designations
- Nova Lac 1936, AAVSO 2212+55, 2MASS J22154108+5537014

Database references
SIMBAD	data

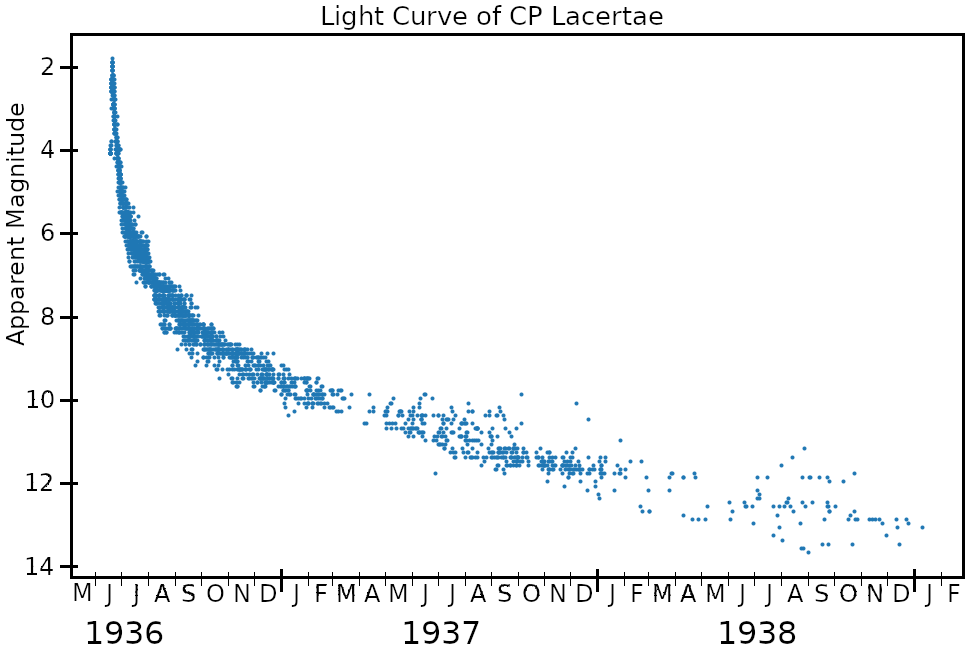
The light curve of CP Lacertae plotted from AAVSO data

CP Lacertae (also known as Nova Lacertae 1936 or CP Lac) was a nova, which lit up on June 18, 1936 in the constellation Lacerta. It was discovered independently by several observers including Leslie Peltier in the US, E. Loreta in Italy, Włodzimierz Zonn (astronomer from Poland observing from Greece) and Kazuaki Gomi, a Japanese barber who discovered the nova during the 19 June 1936 total solar eclipse.

The nova reached a peak brightness of 2.1 mag, making it readily visible to the naked eye during night time. Following the outbreak, the brightness of CP Lacertae decreased thereafter, falling 3 magnitudes after nine days. It is classified as a very fast nova, with a smooth light curve.

Located at an estimated distance of 3.8 kly (1.16 kpc), this is a close binary system with a degenerate white dwarf primary in orbit with a cool red dwarf secondary over a period of 0.145143 days. Matter from the red dwarf is being drawn off onto an accretion disk orbiting the white dwarf. The mean brightness of the system varies with an amplitude of 0.5 magnitude from day to day. The observational data shows a general period of 0.037 days, which may be related to the rotation period of the white dwarf component.

Unlike many novae, CP Lacertae does not have a shell visible as a nebula with optical telescopes.
