= DK Lacertae =

1950 Nova seen in the constellation Lacerta

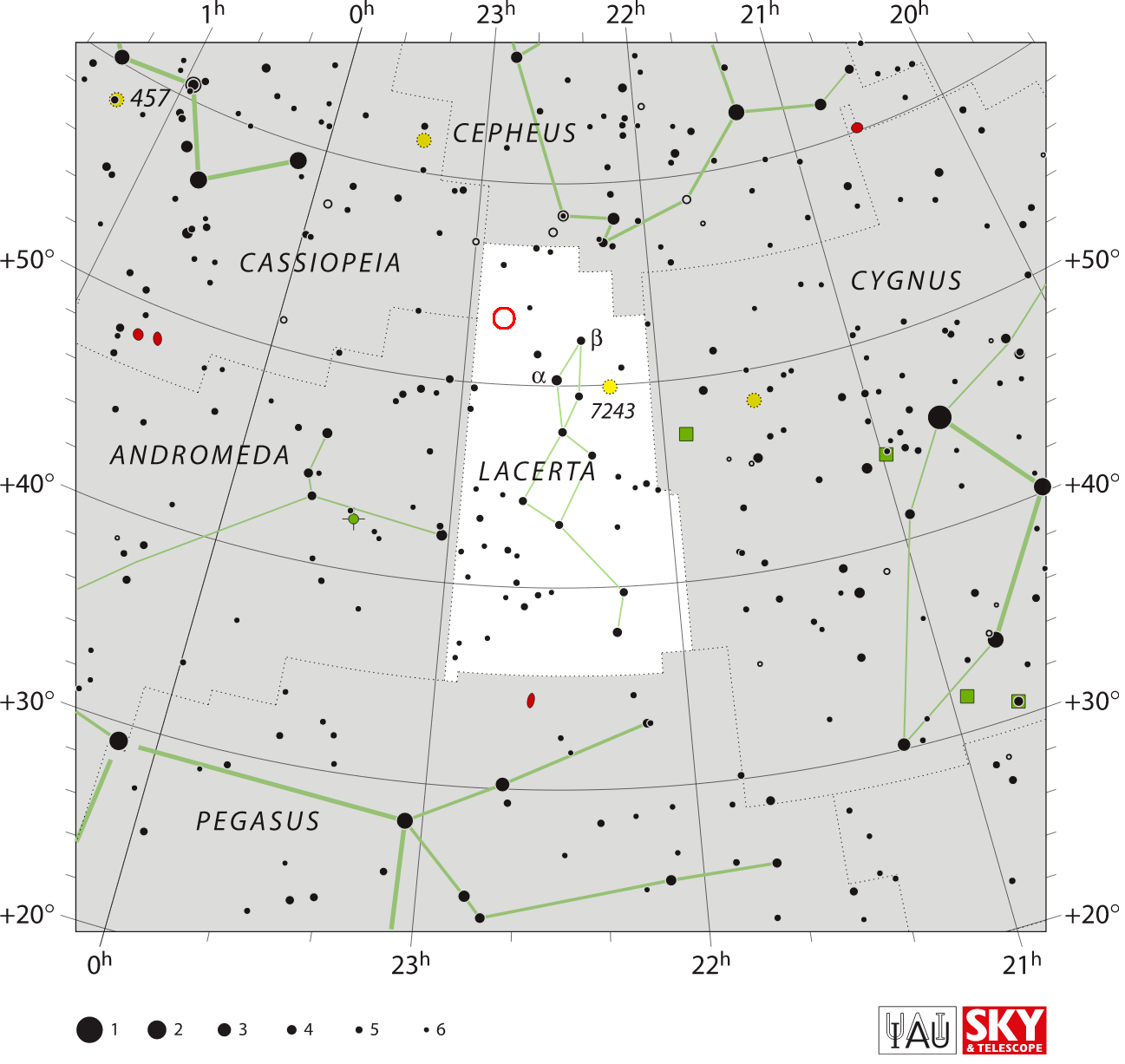
- Location of DK Lacertae (circled in red)

Observation data Epoch J2000 Equinox ICRS
- Constellation: Lacerta
- Right ascension: 22^{h} 49^{m} 46.93114^{s}
- Declination: +53° 17′ 19.7982″
- Apparent magnitude (V): 5.0 – 15.5 (var.)

Characteristics
- Variable type: classical nova

Astrometry
Proper motion (μ)	RA: −1.750±0.050 mas/yr Dec.: −1.653±0.046 mas/yr
Parallax (π)	0.3388±0.0515 mas
Distance	approx. 10,000 ly (approx. 3,000 pc)

Details

DK Lac B
Mass	1.03 M_{☉}

Other designations
- Nova Lacertae 1950, DK Lac, AAVSO 2245+52, 2MASS J22494690+5317192. Gaia DR2 2002440098459791744

Database references
SIMBAD	data

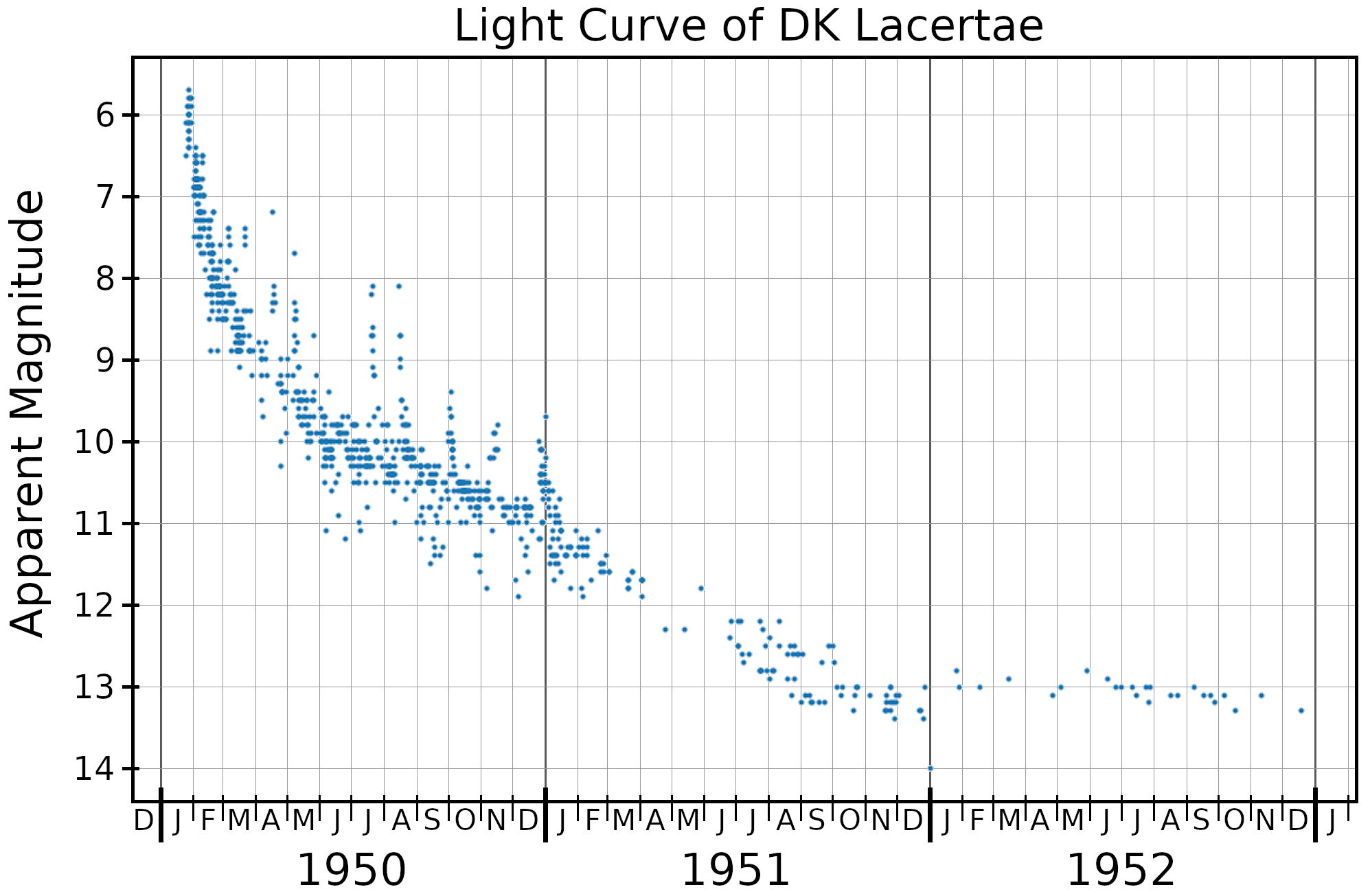
The light curve of DK Lacertae, plotted from AAVSO data. Note the post outburst "jitters" (local maxima) during 1950.

DK Lacertae (Nova Lacertae 1950) was a nova, which lit up in the constellation Lacerta in 1950. The nova was discovered by Charles Bertaud of the Paris Observatory on a photographic plate taken on 23 January 1950. At the time of its discovery, it had an apparent magnitude of 6.1. DK Lacertae reached peak magnitude 5.0, making it easily visible to the naked eye.

DK Lacertae's post-eruption light curve was remarkable for the large number of outbursts of a magnitude or more which occurred in the months after the main nova event. Strope et al. (2010) reported that there were 14 of these "jitters" in the light curve, and they used this star as the prototype object for their type J light curve class. It took about 60 days for the nova to drop from peak brightness by 3 magnitudes, which makes DK Lacertae a "fast" nova.

X-ray emission has been detected from this system.

All novae are binary stars, with a "donor" star orbiting a white dwarf. The donor star is so close to the white dwarf that matter is transferred from the donor to an accretion disk surrounding the white dwarf. In the case of DK Lacertae, Shara et al. (2018) estimate that the white dwarf has a mass of 1.03 M_{☉} and the donor star is transferring 3.4 × 10^{−8} M_{☉} yr^{−1} to the accretion disk. The orbital periods of nova are typically a few hours, but no photometric periodicity on that timescale has been found for DK Lac, suggesting that we are viewing the accretion disk nearly face-on.

A faint shell was detected around the source in 1995, with a radius of about 2.0″–2.5″, but later observations with the Hubble Space Telescope failed to detect the shell.
