= V424 Lacertae =

Star in the constellation Lacerta

- Location of V424 Lacertae (circled)

Observation data Epoch J2000.0 Equinox ICRS
- Constellation: Lacerta
- Right ascension: 22^{h} 56^{m} 25.99839^{s}
- Declination: +49° 44′ 00.7587″
- Apparent magnitude (V): +4.91 to 5.03

Characteristics
- Spectral type: K5 Ib
- U−B color index: +1.95
- B−V color index: +1.77
- Variable type: Lc

Astrometry
Radial velocity (R_{v})	−9.50 km/s
Proper motion (μ)	RA: −0.649 mas/yr Dec.: −2.768 mas/yr
Parallax (π)	1.4018±0.1129 mas
Distance	2,300 ± 200 ly (710 ± 60 pc)
Absolute magnitude (M_{V})	−4.27

Details
Mass	6.8 M_{☉}
Radius	304±24 R_{☉}
Luminosity	16,600+4,300 −3,400 L_{☉}
Surface gravity (log g)	+0.50 cgs
Temperature	3749±49 K

Other designations
- Tengshe, V424 Lac, BD+48°3887, HR 8726, HD 216946, BD+48°3887, HIP 113288, SAO 52516

Database references
SIMBAD	data

V424 Lacertae (V424 Lac), also named Tengshe, is a red supergiant and a variable star in the constellation Lacerta. It is a member of the Lacerta OB1 stellar association.

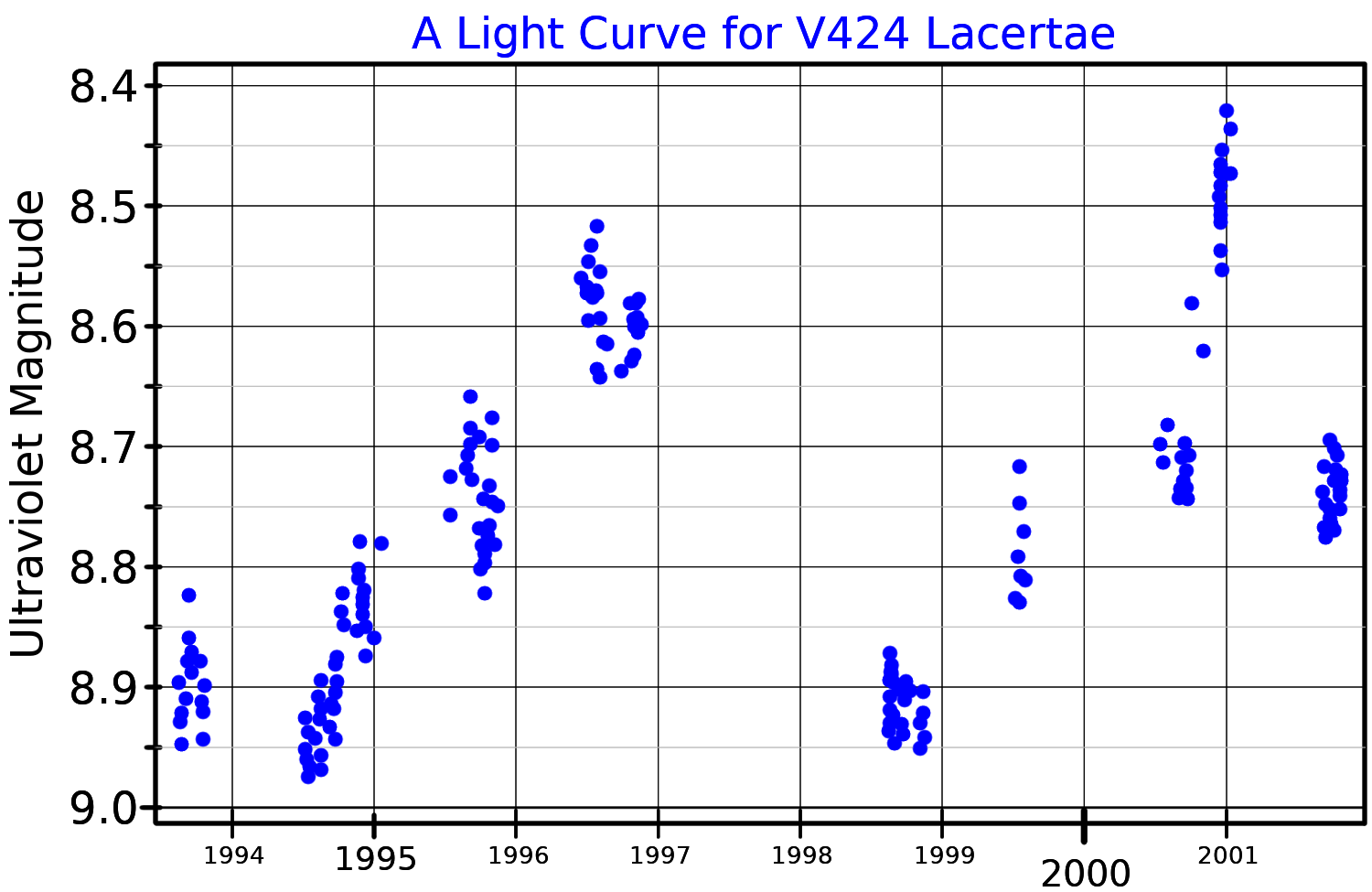
An ultraviolet band light curve light curve for V424 Lacertae, adapted from Messina (2007)

The MK spectral type of V424 Lac has been determined to be K5, but it has also been classified as M0. It was discovered to be slightly variable using analysis of Hipparcos photometry. The total range is less than a tenth of a magnitude. Multiple short periods are detected, as well as slow variations with a period of 1,100 or 1,601 days. Although listed in the General Catalogue of Variable Stars as a slow irregular variable, it has been considered to be either a semiregular variable or long secondary period variable.

There is an ultraviolet excess from V424 Lacertae, that may be due to an unseen companion, which could also explain the long secondary period. On this assumption, a low-mass stellar companion in a 1,382 day 6.2 AU orbit has been suggested.

This star was part of the ancient Chinese constellation Tengshe (螣蛇, Flying Serpent), dating back to the 2nd century BCE. The IAU Working Group on Star Names approved the name Tengshe for this star on 19 September 2024 and it is now so entered in the IAU Catalog of Star Names.
