= EW Lacertae =

Variable star in the constellation Lacerta

- Location of EW Lacertae (circled)

Observation data Epoch J2000.0 Equinox ICRS
- Constellation: Lacerta
- Right ascension: 22^{h} 57^{m} 04.50206^{s}
- Declination: +48° 41′ 02.6456″
- Apparent magnitude (V): +5.22 – +5.48

Characteristics
- Spectral type: B4IIIpe
- Variable type: γ Cas

Astrometry
Proper motion (μ)	RA: 9.298±0.062 mas/yr Dec.: −5.409±0.064 mas/yr
Parallax (π)	3.4800±0.0706 mas
Distance	940 ± 20 ly (287 ± 6 pc)
Absolute magnitude (M_{V})	−1.65

Details
Mass	5.9 M_{☉}
Radius	7.0 R_{☉}
Luminosity	2,084 L_{☉}
Surface gravity (log g)	3.54 cgs
Temperature	15,230 K
Metallicity [Fe/H]	+0.51 dex
Rotational velocity (v sin i)	340 km/s
Age	40 Myr

Other designations
- HD 217050, BD+47 3985, HIP 113327, HR 8731, SAO 52526, Boss 5918

Database references
SIMBAD	data

EW Lacertae, also known as HD 217050 and HR 8731, is a star about 940 light years from the Earth, in the constellation Lacerta. It is a 5th magnitude star, so it will be faintly visible to the naked eye of an observer located far from city lights. It is a Gamma Cassiopeiae variable, varying in brightness from magnitude 5.22 to 5.48, over a period of about 8.7 hours. The star's variable spectrum, which shows changes on timescales ranging from hours to decades, has been monitored for more than a century.

The spectral class of EW Lacertae has been given as B4IIIpe, a hot giant star showing emission lines. Other publications have given types between B1 and B5, a luminosity class of III (giant) or IV (subgiant), and noted various spectral peculiarities related to being a shell star. Models published in Gaia Data Release 3 place the star towards the end of its main sequence life.

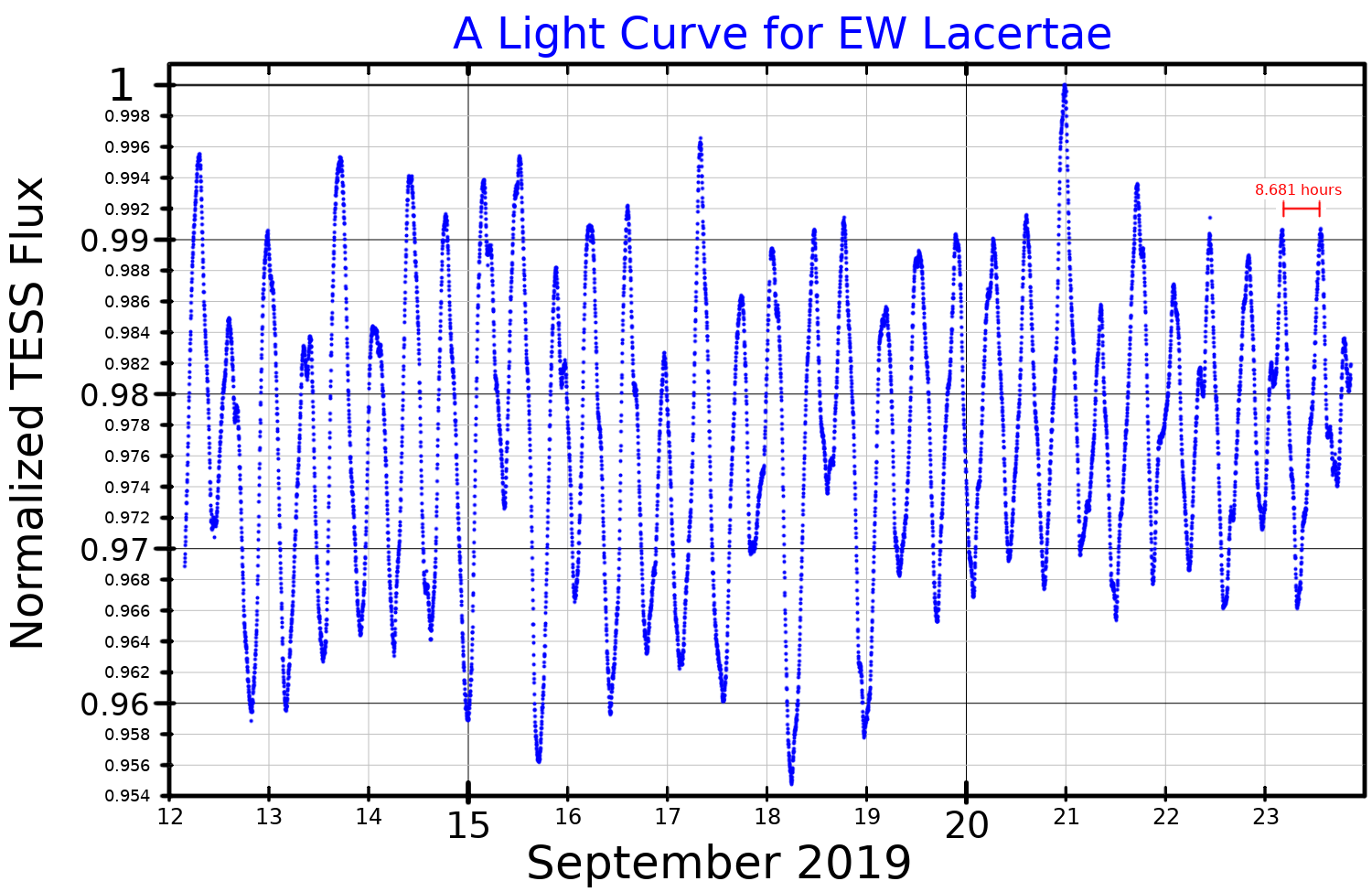
A light curve for EW Lacertae, plotted from TESS data. The 8.681 hour period is marked in red.

Although spectrograms of EW Lacertae, then known as Boss 5918 or BD+47°3985, had been acquired as early as 1887, the existence of an envelope surrounding EW Lacertae was first noticed in a spectrogram taken in 1913. Edwin Frost noted that the star's spectrum was variable, in 1919. In 1943, Ralph Baldwin reported that EW Lacertae had a shell spectrum. The shell spectrum had disappeared in the years 1918 - 1921, but reappeared in 1922. Spectra taken in 1925, 1926 and 1928 again showed no features associated with a shell, but the shell features in the spectrum were very clear by the end of 1940.

Observations in the early 1950s at the Lick Observatory by Merle Walker revealed that EW Lacertae was a variable star, and it was given its variable star designation in the General Catalogue of Variable Stars.

The complex variations seen in the spectrum of EW Lacertae may be caused by a disk of gas surrounding the star, seen nearly edge-on by an observer on the Earth, which occasionally has temporary density enhancements which persist for years.
