= HD 211073 =

Triple star system in the constellation Lacerta

- Location of HD 211073 (circled in red)

Observation data Epoch J2000.0 Equinox J2000.0
- Constellation: Lacerta
- Right ascension: 22^{h} 13^{m} 52.72751^{s}
- Declination: +39° 42′ 53.7288″
- Apparent magnitude (V): 4.50 (4.49–4.55)

Characteristics
- Evolutionary stage: horizontal branch
- Spectral type: K2.5 III
- B−V color index: 1.39
- Variable type: suspected

Astrometry
Radial velocity (R_{v})	−11.69±0.13 km/s
Proper motion (μ)	RA: +38.941±0.104 mas/yr Dec.: +19.342±0.125 mas/yr
Parallax (π)	5.7181±0.1508 mas
Distance	570 ± 20 ly (175 ± 5 pc)
Absolute magnitude (M_{V})	−1.34

Details

HD 211073 Aa
Mass	2.23+0.22 −0.26 M_{☉}
Radius	45.69+2.17 −2.39 R_{☉}
Luminosity	573.50+51.88 −61.58 L_{☉}
Surface gravity (log g)	1.46+0.05 −0.04 cgs
Temperature	4,180+12 −14 K
Rotational velocity (v sin i)	2.9±1.0 km/s
Age	1.00+0.38 −0.19 Gyr

Other designations
- NSV 14076, BD+38°4711, FK5 1583, HD 211073, HIP 109754, HR 8485, SAO 72155, WDS J22139+3943

Database references
SIMBAD	data

HD 211073 is a triple star system in the northern constellation Lacerta, located around 570 light years from the Sun. It is visible to the naked eye as a faint orange-hued star with a baseline apparent visual magnitude of 4.50. The system is moving closer to the Earth with a heliocentric radial velocity of −11.7 km/s.

The primary member, designated component Aa, is an evolved giant star with a stellar classification of K2.5 III that is most likely (98% chance) on the horizontal branch. It is a suspected variable star that ranges in magnitude from 4.49 down to 4.55. This star is around a billion years old with 2.2 times the mass of the Sun and has expanded to 46 times the Sun's radius. It is radiating about 574 times the Sun's luminosity from its enlarged photosphere at an effective temperature of 4,180 K.

As of 2005, the inner pair of stars (Aa + Ab) in this system had an angular separation of 0.20″ along a position angle (PA) of 170°. The magnitude 8.15 component Ac was separated from Aa by 0.30″ with a PA of 27°, as of 2010. As of 2015, the magnitude 10.60 visual companion, designated component B, was separated from the primary by 30.50″ along a PA of 190°.
