= 11 Lacertae =

Star in the constellation Lacerta

- Location of 11 Lacertae (circled in red)

Observation data Epoch J2000 Equinox ICRS
- Constellation: Lacerta
- Right ascension: 22^{h} 40^{m} 30.85848^{s}
- Declination: +44° 16′ 34.7069″
- Apparent magnitude (V): 4.46

Characteristics
- Evolutionary stage: red clump
- Spectral type: K2.5 III
- U−B color index: +1.36
- B−V color index: +1.33

Astrometry
Radial velocity (R_{v})	−10.91±0.09 km/s
Proper motion (μ)	RA: +93.728 mas/yr Dec.: +10.946 mas/yr
Parallax (π)	9.317±0.105 mas
Distance	350 ± 4 ly (107 ± 1 pc)
Absolute magnitude (M_{V})	−0.54

Details
Mass	1.38 M_{☉}
Radius	30.24±0.34 R_{☉}
Luminosity	279±10 L_{☉}
Surface gravity (log g)	1.56±0.06 cgs
Temperature	4,352 K
Metallicity [Fe/H]	−0.2±0.02 dex
Rotational velocity (v sin i)	8 km/s
Age	3.2 Gyr

Other designations
- 11 Lac, BD+43°4266, HD 214868, HIP 111944, HR 8632, SAO 52251

Database references
SIMBAD	data

11 Lacertae is a star in the northern constellation of Lacerta. It is visible to the naked eye as a faint orange-hued star with an apparent visual magnitude of 4.46. It lies at a distance of about 350 light years and has an absolute magnitude -0.54. The object is moving closer to the Earth with a heliocentric radial velocity of −10.9 km/s.

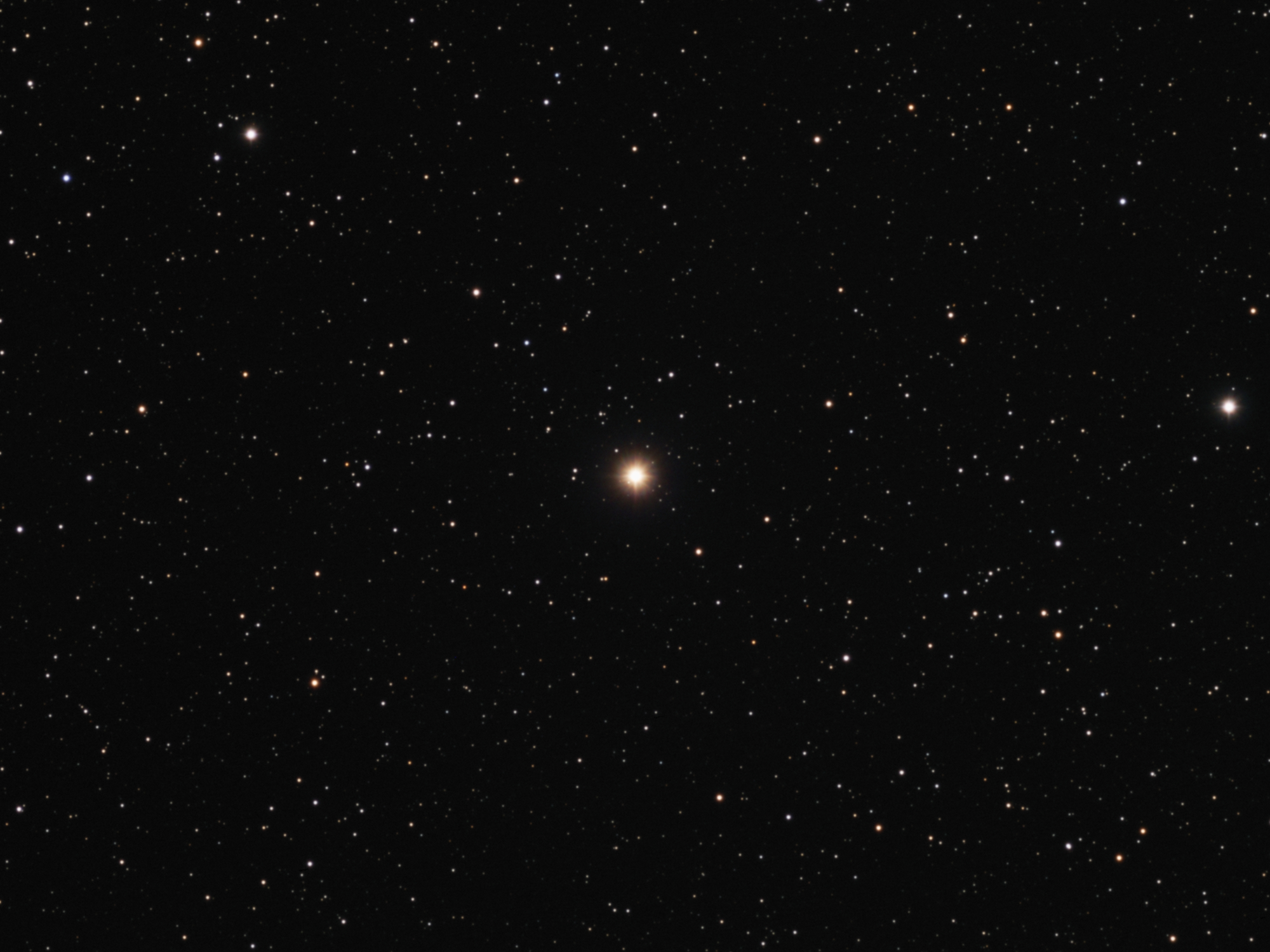
11 Lacertae in optical light

This is an evolved giant star with a stellar classification of K2.5 III. It is a red clump giant, meaning it is fusing helium in its core after passing through the red giant branch. The star is 3.2 billion years old with 1.38 times the mass of the Sun and has expanded to 30 times the Sun's radius. It is radiating 280 times the Sun's luminosity from its enlarged photosphere at an effective temperature of 4,352 K.
