= 1 Lacertae =

Star in the constellation Lacerta

- Location of 1 Lacertae (circled)

Observation data Epoch J2000.0 Equinox ICRS
- Constellation: Lacerta
- Right ascension: 22^{h} 15^{m} 58.17690^{s}
- Declination: +37° 44′ 55.4468″
- Apparent magnitude (V): 4.15

Characteristics
- Evolutionary stage: horizontal branch
- Spectral type: K3 II-III
- U−B color index: +1.70
- B−V color index: +1.43

Astrometry
Radial velocity (R_{v})	−8.58 km/s
Proper motion (μ)	RA: +8.851 mas/yr Dec.: –0.089 mas/yr
Parallax (π)	4.8108±0.1322 mas
Distance	680 ± 20 ly (208 ± 6 pc)
Absolute magnitude (M_{V})	−2.61+0.27 −0.24

Details
Mass	4.16±0.28 M_{☉}
Radius	69.01+3.32 −3.07 R_{☉}
Luminosity	1,453±147 L_{☉}
Surface gravity (log g)	2.15 cgs
Temperature	4,288±62 K
Metallicity [Fe/H]	−0.01 dex
Rotational velocity (v sin i)	10 km/s
Age	170±30 Myr

Other designations
- 1 Lac, NSV 25864, BD+37°4526, HD 211388, HIP 109937, HR 8498, SAO 72191

Database references
SIMBAD	data

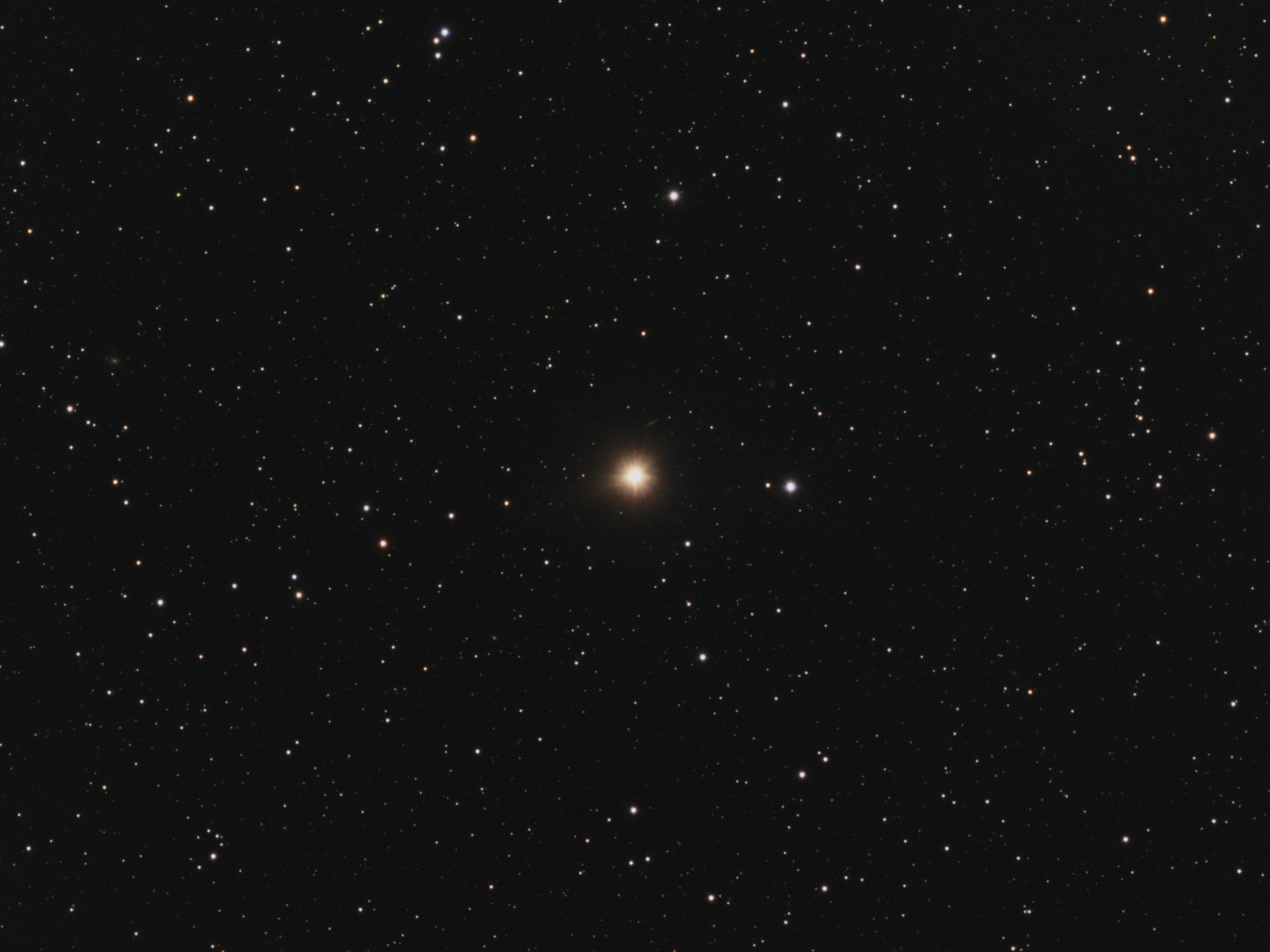
1 Lacertae in optical light

1 Lacertae is a solitary star in the northern constellation of Lacerta. It is visible to the naked eye with an apparent visual magnitude of 4.15. Based upon measurements by the Hipparcos spacecraft, this star is located at a distance of roughly 680 light years. It is moving closer to the Earth with a heliocentric radial velocity of −8.6 km/s.

A stellar classification of K3 II-III suggests this is an evolved star with a luminosity class intermediate between a giant and bright giant. It is 170 million years old with around four times the mass of the Sun and has expanded to an estimated 69 times the Sun's radius. The star is radiating 1,453 times the Sun's luminosity from its enlarged photosphere at an effective temperature of 4,288 K, giving it the orange-hued glow of a K-type star. The star was once a suspected variable, but this was later rescinded.
