= 15 Lacertae =

Star in the constellation Lacerta

- Location of 15 Lacertae (circled in red)

Observation data Epoch J2000 Equinox ICRS
- Constellation: Lacerta
- Right ascension: 22^{h} 52^{m} 02.03323^{s}
- Declination: +43° 18′ 44.7028″
- Apparent magnitude (V): 4.95 + 11.9

Characteristics
- Spectral type: M0 III
- B−V color index: 1.559±0.010

Astrometry
Radial velocity (R_{v})	−19.21±0.20 km/s
Proper motion (μ)	RA: +109.890±0.214 mas/yr Dec.: +23.581±0.215 mas/yr
Parallax (π)	9.6841±0.1425 mas
Distance	337 ± 5 ly (103 ± 2 pc)
Absolute magnitude (M_{V})	−0.04

Details
Mass	1.3 M_{☉}
Radius	35 R_{☉}
Luminosity	269 L_{☉}
Surface gravity (log g)	1.79 cgs
Temperature	4,047 K
Metallicity [Fe/H]	−0.22 dex
Age	12.7 Gyr

Other designations
- 15 Lac, BD+42°4521, GC 31896, HD 216397, HIP 112917, HR 8699, SAO 52436, WDS J22520+4319

Database references
SIMBAD	data

15 Lacertae is a binary star system in the northern constellation of Lacerta, near the southeast constellation border with Andromeda. It is faintly visible to the naked eye with an apparent visual magnitude of 4.95. The distance to this system is approximately 337 light years based on parallax. It is drifting closer to the Sun with a radial velocity of −19 km/s. The absolute magnitude of 15 Lacertae is −0.04.

The primary component is an aging red giant with a stellar classification of M0 III. With the supply of hydrogen at its core exhausted, the star has cooled and expanded to 35 times the Sun's radius. It is radiating 269 times the luminosity of the Sun from its swollen photosphere at an effective temperature of 4,047 K giving it a reddish hue.

The secondary companion was discovered by American astronomer S. W. Burnham in 1888. It has a visual magnitude of 11.9 and is located at an angular separation of 23.6″ from the primary along a position angle of 159°, as of 2014.
