= 5 Lacertae =

Star in the constellation Lacerta

- Location of 5 Lacertae (circled)

Observation data Epoch J2000 Equinox J2000
- Constellation: Lacerta
- Right ascension: 22^{h} 29^{m} 31.823^{s}
- Declination: +47° 42′ 24.79″
- Apparent magnitude (V): 4.36

Characteristics
- Spectral type: K6–M0I + B7/8V
- U−B color index: +1.11
- B−V color index: +1.68
- Variable type: LC

Astrometry
Radial velocity (R_{v})	−3.4±0.2 km/s
Proper motion (μ)	RA: −2.554 mas/yr Dec.: −5.372 mas/yr
Parallax (π)	1.4838±0.1383 mas
Distance	2,170+200 −180 ly (665+62 −54 pc)
Absolute magnitude (M_{V})	−4.16

Orbit
Period (P)	41.95±0.20 yr
Eccentricity (e)	0.49±0.01
Periastron epoch (T)	2427578.3±260 JD
Argument of periastron (ω) (secondary)	323±5.0°
Semi-amplitude (K_{1}) (primary)	12.2±1.2 km/s
Semi-amplitude (K_{2}) (secondary)	112.0±8.2 km/s

Details

5 Lacertae A
Mass	5.11±0.18 M_{☉}
Radius	427+36 −44 R_{☉}
Luminosity	25,100 (Note: 10^4.4 = 25119) L_{☉}
Temperature	3,790 (Note: 10^3.57863921 = 3,790) K
Rotational velocity (v sin i)	50 km/s
Age	110±10 Myr

5 Lacertae B
Rotational velocity (v sin i)	89 km/s

Other designations
- V412 Lac, BD+46°3719, FK5 3799, HD 213310/1, HIP 111022, HR 8572, SAO 52055

Database references
SIMBAD	data

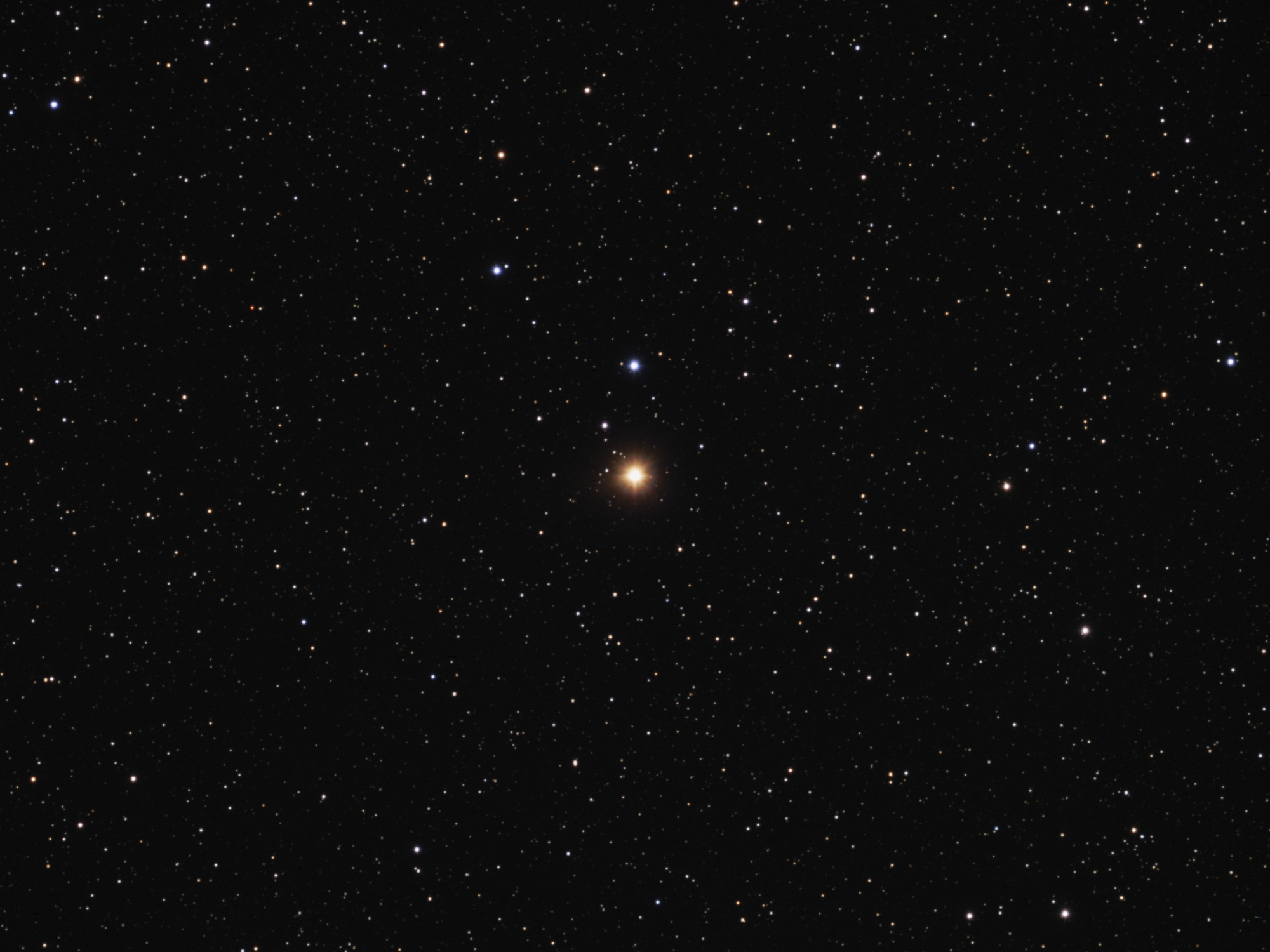
5 Lacertae in optical light

5 Lacertae (5 Lac) is a spectroscopic binary in the constellation Lacerta. Its apparent magnitude is 4.36.

== Variability ==
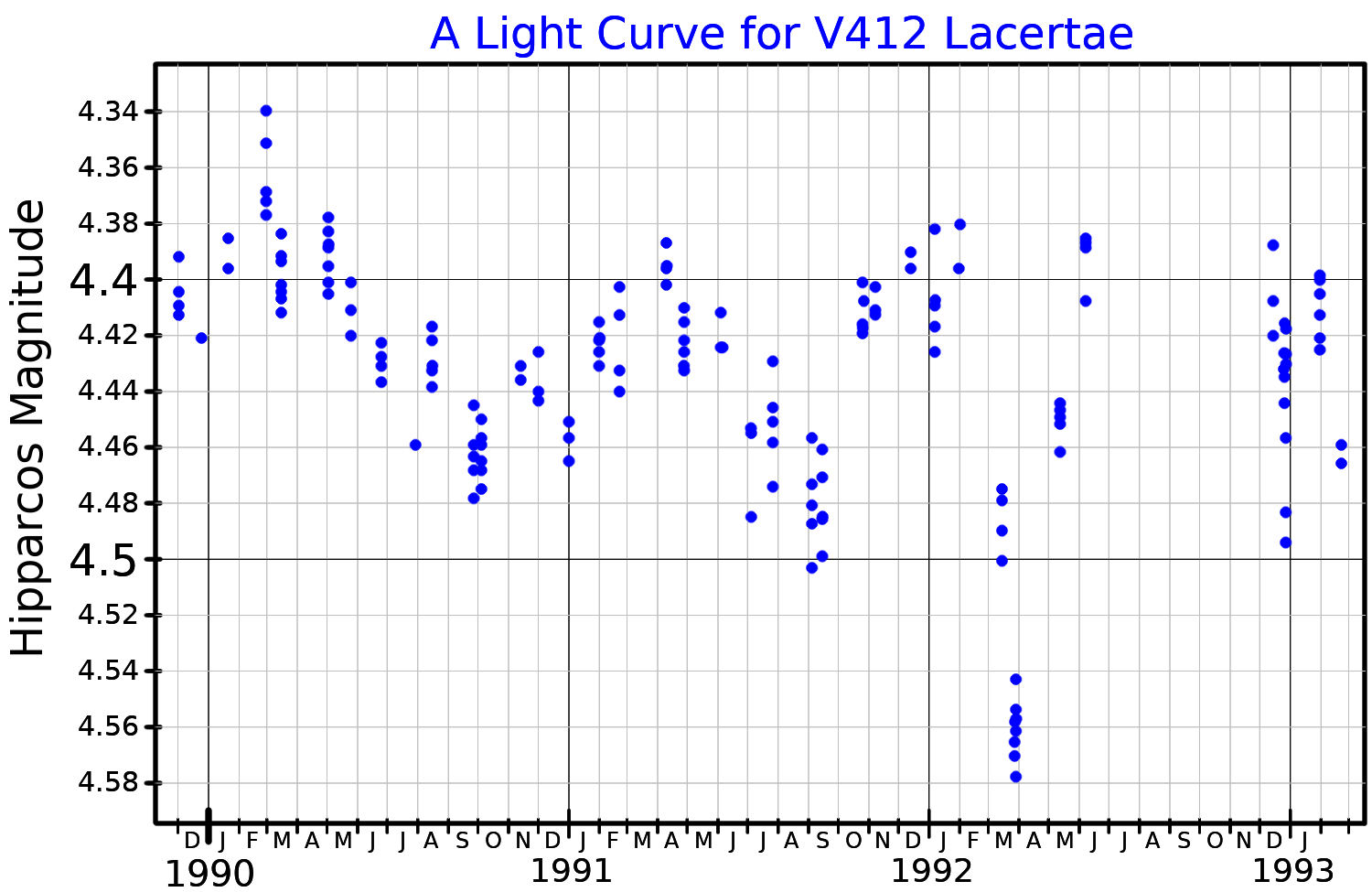
A light curve for V412 Lacertae, plotted from Hipparcos data

5 Lacertae is a slow irregular variable star with a small amplitude. Photometry from the Hipparcos satellite showed brightness changes between Hipparcos magnitudes 4.39 and 4.56 with no clear periodicity. It was given the variable star designation V412 Lacertae in 1999 in a special name-list dedicated to variables detected from Hipparcos.

== Characteristics ==
The spectrum of 5 Lacertae clearly indicates both a hot component and a cooler component, recognised even in early spectra. Published spectral types for the brighter cool component vary from K4 to M0, with a luminosity class of giant or supergiant. The hotter star is generally classed as a relatively unevolved late B or early A star, but an automated classification program gave it a spectral class of B2V.

Radial velocity variations in the absorption lines from the two separate stars have been measured to determine the orbit. This has an unusually long period of almost 42 years. The two stars have an eccentric orbit with a projected axis of about 15 au.
