= 14 Lacertae =

Binary star in the constellation Lacerta

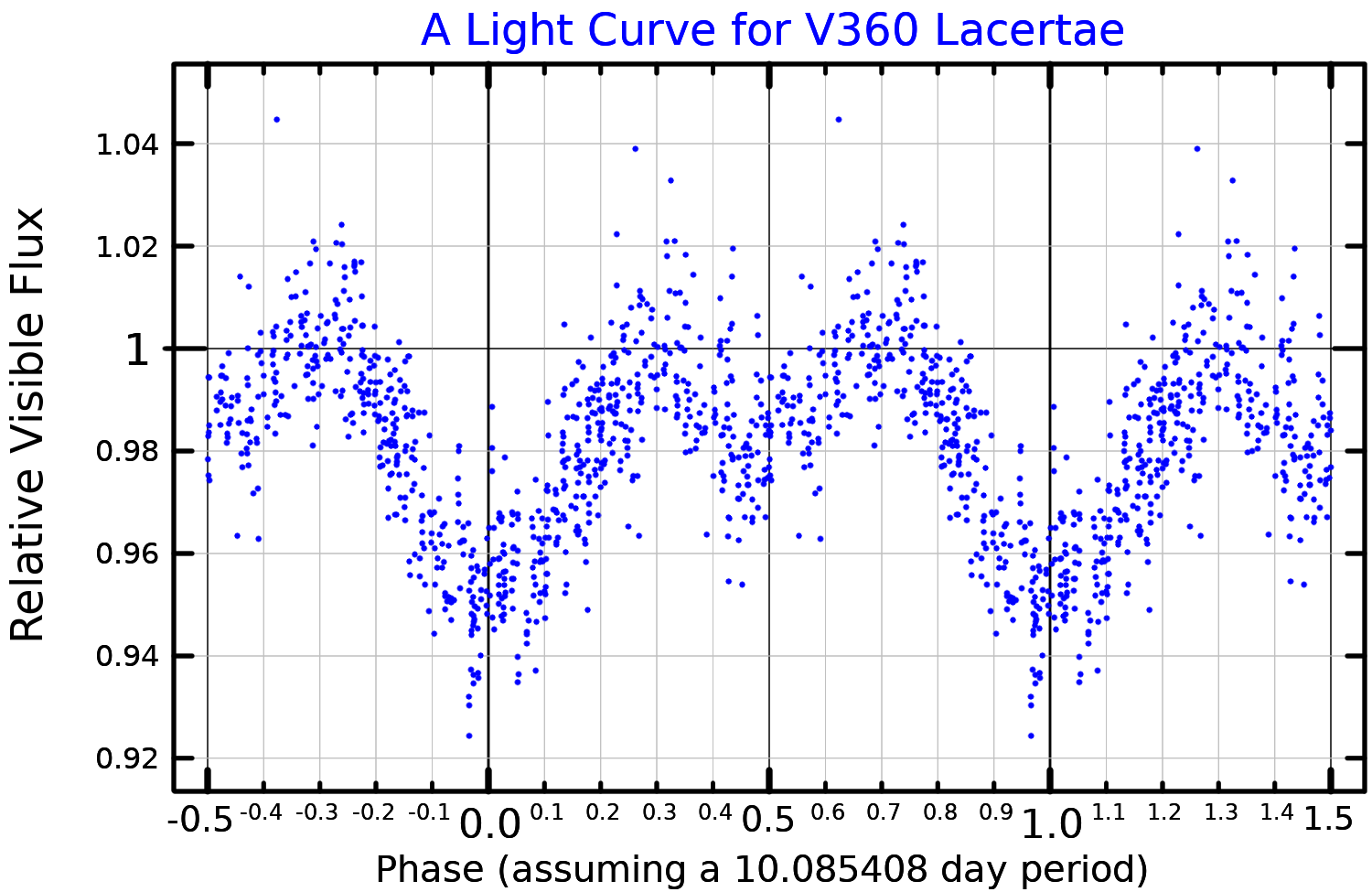
- A visual band light curve for V360 Lacertae, adapted from Linnell et al. (2006)

Observation data Epoch J2000 Equinox ICRS
- Constellation: Lacerta
- Right ascension: 22^{h} 50^{m} 21.77721^{s}
- Declination: +41° 57′ 12.1795″
- Apparent magnitude (V): 5.91

Characteristics
- Spectral type: B3IV:eaV (B4 + F9 III)
- U−B color index: −0.508
- B−V color index: +0.083
- Variable type: β Lyr

Astrometry
| Radial velocity (R_{v}) | −15.8±3.1 km/s |
| Proper motion (μ) | RA: +6.047 mas/yr Dec.: +1.124 mas/yr |
| Parallax (π) | 2.0147±0.1990 mas |
| Distance | 1,600 ± 200 ly (500 ± 50 pc) |

Orbit
| Period (P) | 10.085415±0.000080 d |
| Eccentricity (e) | 0.0 |
| Periastron epoch (T) | 2441170.285±0.029 |
| Semi-amplitude (K_{1}) (primary) | 25.8±1.7 km/s |
| Semi-amplitude (K_{2}) (secondary) | 159.2±0.2 km/s |

Details

14 Lac A
| Mass | 7.45±0.3 M_{☉} |
| Radius | (polar) 7.55 R_{☉} |
| Surface gravity (log g) | 3.55 cgs |
| Temperature | (Polar) 18,000±1,000 K |

14 Lac B
| Mass | 1.21±0.05 M_{☉} |
| Radius | (polar) 8.85 R_{☉} |
| Surface gravity (log g) | 2.65 cgs |
| Temperature | (polar) 6,000±200 K |

Other designations
- 14 Lac, V360 Lac, BD+41°4623, HD 216200, HIP 112778, HR 8690, SAO 52412, WDS J22504+4157

Database references
| SIMBAD | data |

14 Lacertae is a binary star system in the northern constellation Lacerta, located around 1,600 light years away. It has the variable star designation V360 Lacertae; 14 Lacertae is the Flamsteed designation. The system is barely visible to the naked eye in good seeing conditions, having a peak apparent visual magnitude of 5.91. It is moving closer to the Earth with a heliocentric radial velocity of −16 km/s.

This is a double-lined spectroscopic binary in a close, circular orbit with a period of 10.08 days and a separation of 40.327 R_{☉} (28.055 Gm). The orbital inclination is 65°±1°. 14 Lac is a variable star system that, once per orbit, shows a primary minimum with a 0.07 magnitude decrease and a secondary minimum with a decrease of 0.02. The primary component is a Be star that is spinning rapidly at its critical velocity. The lower mass secondary is synchronously rotating and is filling its Roche lobe. The rapid rotation of the primary may have been caused by mass transfer from the secondary.

Samus et al. (2017) classify this as a detached Beta Lyrae-type eclipsing binary, although they note there is some uncertainty in the classification. Bossi et al. (1998) argued that the system is neither an eclipsing binary nor an ellipsoidal variable. Instead they propose the variability is caused by distortion of a gaseous shell by the secondary component. Linnell et al. (2006) demonstrated that the light curve is mostly caused by tidal distortion in combination with illumination of the lower mass secondary by the primary.
