= 2 Lacertae =

Star in the constellation Lacerta

- Location of 2 Lacertae (circled)

Observation data Epoch J2000 Equinox J2000
- Constellation: Lacerta
- Right ascension: 22^{h} 21^{m} 01.54727^{s}
- Declination: +46° 32′ 11.6461″
- Apparent magnitude (V): 4.53 – 4.56

Characteristics
- Spectral type: B6V (B6IV + B6V)
- U−B color index: −0.49
- B−V color index: −0.14
- Variable type: Ellipsoidal (suspected)

Astrometry
Radial velocity (R_{v})	−13.19±0.19 km/s
Proper motion (μ)	RA: 22.35 mas/yr Dec.: 1.45 mas/yr
Parallax (π)	5.88±0.14 mas
Distance	550 ± 10 ly (170 ± 4 pc)
Absolute magnitude (M_{V})	−1.19

Orbit
Period (P)	2.61656±0.00002 days
Eccentricity (e)	0
Inclination (i)	near 90°
Periastron epoch (T)	59,021.391±0.002
Semi-amplitude (K_{1}) (primary)	73.65±0.31 km/s
Semi-amplitude (K_{2}) (secondary)	89.11±0.34 km/s

Details

primary
Mass	6.99 M_{☉}
Surface gravity (log g)	3.0 cgs
Temperature	15,000 K
Rotational velocity (v sin i)	50 km/s

secondary
Mass	5.55 M_{☉}
Rotational velocity (v sin i)	35 km/s

Other designations
- BD+45°3894, HD 212120, HIP 110351, HR 8523, SAO 51904

Database references
SIMBAD	data

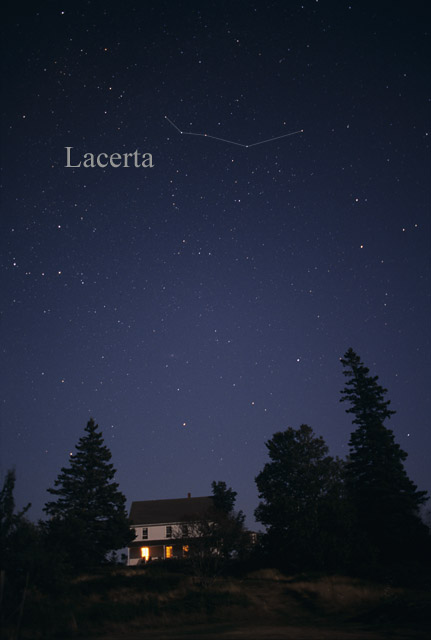
Photograph of Lacerta

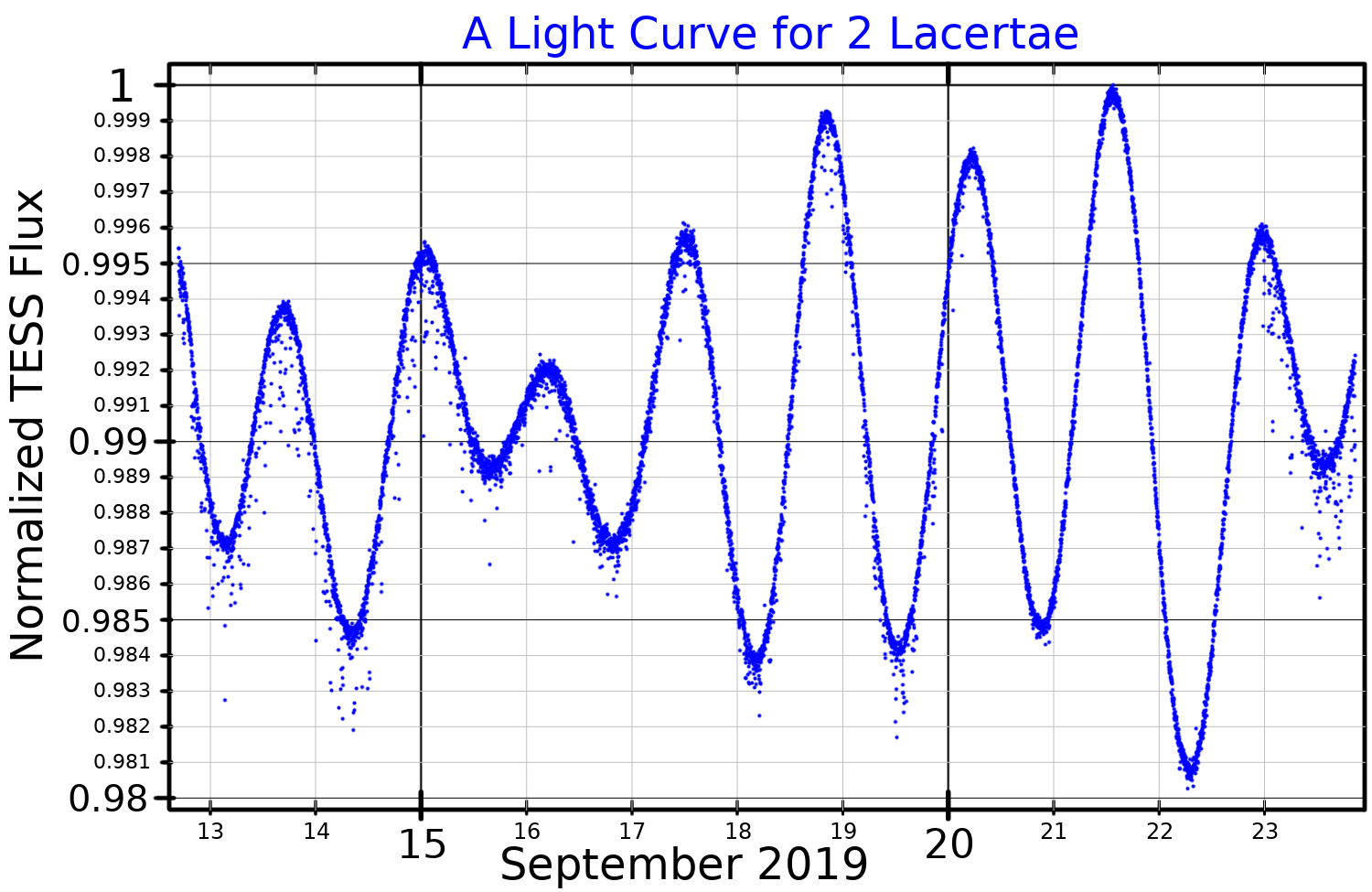
A light curve for 2 Lacertae, plotted from TESS data

2 Lacertae is a binary star in the constellation of Lacerta. With an apparent magnitude of about 4.5, it is faintly visible to the naked eye. Its parallax, measured by the Hipparcos spacecraft, is 5.88 milliarcseconds, corresponding to a distance of about 550 light years (170 parsecs). It is projected against the Lacertae OB1 stellar association to the northeast of the main concentration of stars, but it is likely to be a foreground object.

2 Lacertae is a double-lined spectroscopic binary. Its components are too close to be resolved, however periodic Doppler shifts in its spectrum reveal that there are two stars orbiting each other. Both stars are B-type main-sequence stars, orbiting each other every 2.617 days at a circular path. The primary is estimated to be about one magnitude brighter than the secondary. The primary component is close to moving off the main sequence, and has nearly exhausted its core hydrogen (possibly also its companion). It is estimated to have completed over 90% of its time on the main sequence.

2 Lacertae is a rotating ellipsoidal variable, a binary system in which the stars are close enough to each other for one or both stars to be significantly distorted by tidal forces. The stars' orbital plane is not aligned closely enough to our line of sight for the stars to eclipse each other, but the stars' orbital motion does cause us to view different portions of the non-spherical stars' surfaces, leading to brightness changes. 2 Lacertae varies by about 0.03 magnitudes as the stars orbit each other.
