= 6 Lacertae =

Star in the constellation Lacerta

- Location of 6 Lacertae (circled in red)

Observation data Epoch J2000 Equinox J2000
- Constellation: Lacerta
- Right ascension: 22^{h} 30^{m} 29.26005^{s}
- Declination: +43° 07′ 24.1565″
- Apparent magnitude (V): 4.52

Characteristics
- Spectral type: B2 IV
- B−V color index: −0.086±0.018

Astrometry
Radial velocity (R_{v})	−8.7±0.9 km/s
Proper motion (μ)	RA: −4.800 mas/yr Dec.: −2.598 mas/yr
Parallax (π)	1.7577±0.2697 mas
Distance	approx. 1,900 ly (approx. 570 pc)
Absolute magnitude (M_{V})	−2.62

Orbit
Period (P)	880 days
Eccentricity (e)	0.30
Periastron epoch (T)	2,416,300 JD
Argument of periastron (ω) (secondary)	190°
Semi-amplitude (K_{1}) (primary)	9 km/s

Details
Mass	12.5±0.6 M_{☉}
Radius	6.9 R_{☉}
Luminosity (bolometric)	34,590 L_{☉}
Surface gravity (log g)	3.56 cgs
Temperature	21,150 K
Metallicity [Fe/H]	−0.04 dex
Rotational velocity (v sin i)	70 km/s
Age	15.7±0.1 Myr

Other designations
- 6 Lac, BD+42°4420, FK5 3800, HD 213420, HIP 111104, HR 8579, SAO 52079

Database references
SIMBAD	data

6 Lacertae is a binary star system in the northern constellation of Lacerta, located around 1,900 light years from the Sun. It is visible to the naked eye as a dim, blue-white hued star with a combined apparent visual magnitude of 4.52. The system is moving closer to the Earth with a heliocentric radial velocity of −9 km/s, and is a suspected member of the Lac OB1 association.

This system forms a single-lined spectroscopic binary with an orbital period of 880 days and an eccentricity of 0.3. The visible component has a stellar classification of B2 IV, matching a B-type subgiant star. It is about 16 million years old with a relatively high projected rotational velocity of 70 km/s. The star has 12.5 times the mass of the Sun and about 7 times the Sun's radius. It is radiating a net 34,590 times the Sun's luminosity from its photosphere at an effective temperature of 21,150 K.
