= 10 Lacertae =

Star in the constellation Lacerta

- Location of 10 Lac (circled)

Observation data Epoch J2000 Equinox ICRS
- Constellation: Lacerta
- Right ascension: 22^{h} 39^{m} 15.67804^{s}
- Declination: +39° 03′ 00.9724″
- Apparent magnitude (V): 4.880

Characteristics
- Spectral type: O9V
- U−B color index: −1.010
- B−V color index: −0.210
- Variable type: β Cep?

Astrometry
Radial velocity (R_{v})	−10.10 km/s
Proper motion (μ)	RA: −1.274 mas/yr Dec.: −5.605 mas/yr
Parallax (π)	2.192±0.131 mas
Distance	1,800±100 ly (552±32 pc)
Absolute magnitude (M_{V})	−4.17±0.12

Details
Mass	21.6±0.5 M_{☉}
Radius	7.4±0.5 R_{☉}
Luminosity	69,200+8,440 −7,520 L_{☉}
Surface gravity (log g)	4.04±0.05 cgs
Temperature	34,550±300 K
Rotational velocity (v sin i)	14±1 km/s
Age	3.55+0.72 −0.60 Myr

Other designations
- 10 Lac, HR 8622, BD+38°4826, HD 214680, SAO 72575, HIP 111841, NSV 25932, WDS J22393+3903

Database references
SIMBAD	data

10 Lacertae (10 Lac) is a star in the constellation Lacerta. With an apparent magnitude of 4.9, it is located around 550 parsecs (1,800 ly) distant in the small Lacerta OB1 association. It is a hot blue main-sequence star of spectral type O9V, a massive star that is currently fusing its core hydrogen. It is a suspected Beta Cephei variable star.

It was one of the first O-type stars (along with S Monocerotis) to be defined as an anchor point for the MKK spectral classification; since the early twentieth century it has served as such a point. Specifically, the star is representative of O9V stars, meaning relatively cool O-type stars on the main-sequence.

It is the star with the smallest angular diameter measured by the CHARA array as of 2018, at 0.11±0.02 milliarcseconds.

10 Lacertae has an 8th magnitude companion about one arc-minute away.
