= Barque of Saint Peter =

Symbol of the Catholic Church

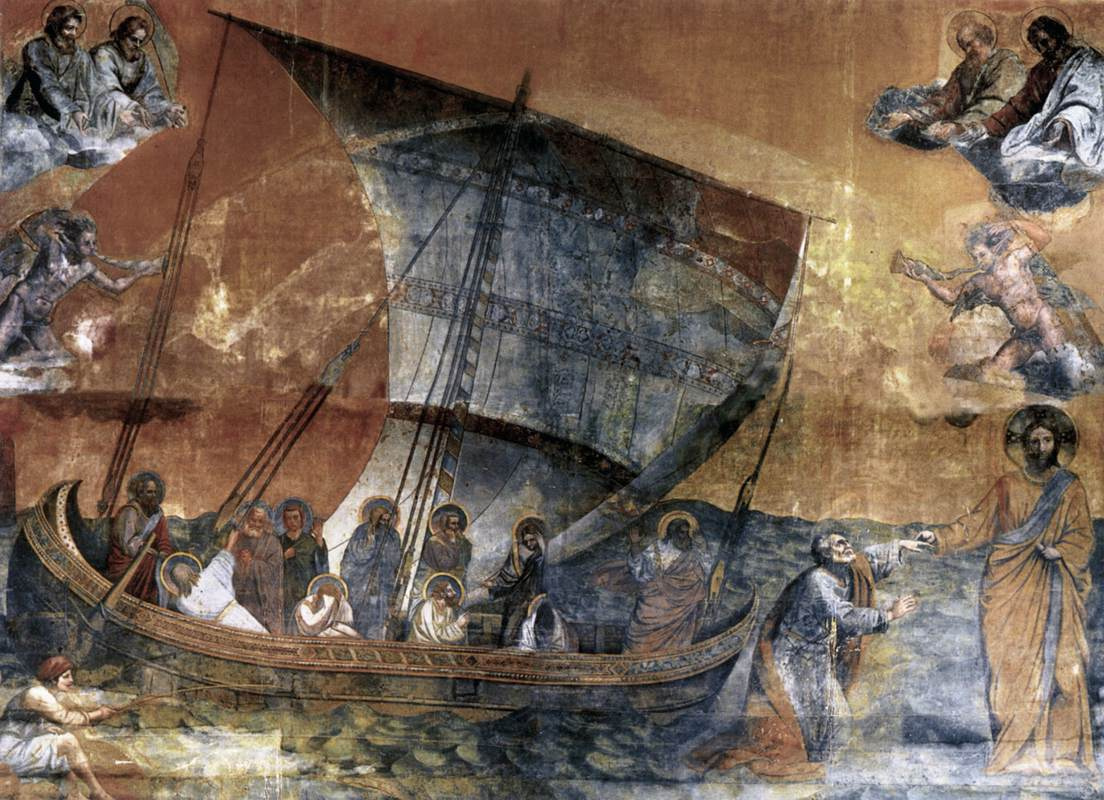
1628 Navicella copy in oil in the Vatican

The Barque of Saint Peter symbolises the Catholic Church as a barque. Saint Peter, the first pope, was a fisherman who became one of the twelve Apostles of Jesus. The Catholic Church believes that all succeeding popes, as his successors, steer the Barque. This may explain the etymology of the central part of churches, the nave, which stems from the Latin word for ship, navis.

== History ==
The image of the Barque of St. Peter is tied to Noah's Ark in the First Epistle of Peter 3:20-21 and Jesus calming the storm at the sea of Galilee in Mark 4:35-41.

=== Catholicism ===
Between 150 and 240 AD Tertullian, "the founder of Western theology", referred to the Church as a ship in De Baptismo (On Baptism):

"...the apostles then served the turn of baptism when in their little ship, were sprinkled and covered with the waves: that Peter himself also was immersed enough when he walked on the sea."[8] It is, however, as I think, one thing to be sprinkled or intercepted by the violence of the sea; another thing to be baptized in obedience to the discipline of religion. But that little ship did present a figure of the Church, in that she is disquieted "in the sea", that is, in the world,[9] "by the waves", that is, by persecutions and temptations; the Lord, through patience, sleeping as it were, until, roused in their last extremities by the prayers of the saints, He checks the world,[10] and restores tranquility to His own."

Circa 195 AD Clement of Alexandria approved the use of a ship as a symbol for signet rings in the third book of his Paedagogus:

"...let our seals be either a dove, or a fish, or a ship scudding before the wind, or a musical lyre, which Polycrates used, or a ship's anchor, which Seleucus got engraved as a device; and if there be one fishing, he will remember the apostle, and the children drawn out of the water."

Between 375 and 380 AD In the book II of the Apostolic Constitutions:

"When you call an assembly of the Church as one that is the commander of a great ship, appoint the assemblies to be made with all possible skill, charging the deacons as mariners to prepare places for the brethren as for passengers, with all due care and decency. And first, let the building be long, with its head to the east, with its vestries on both sides at the east end, and so it will be like a ship. In the middle let the bishop's throne be placed, and on each side of him let the presbytery sit down; and let the deacons stand near at hand, in close and small girt garments, for they are like the mariners and managers of the ship"

In 1298 AD the Bark of St. Peter, commonly known as the Navicella, by Giotto was commissioned for the Old Saint Peter's Basilica in Rome.

In 1241 AD Pope Gregory IX or Pope Innocent IV, in response to the destruction of the Genoese fleet in the Battle of Giglio, said:

Niteris incassum navem submergere Petri / Fluctuat at numquam mergitur illa ratis.
"In vain you strive to submerge the ship of Peter — this vessel rocks but is never submerged."

This distich would inspire the motto of Paris and be featured on Paris' coat of arms.

In the twelfth volume (1596) of the Annales Ecclesiastici historian Cardinal Baronius writes on the condition of the Irish Church in 566 AD:

"...having made shipwreck in consequence of not following the Barque of St. Peter"

=== Eastern Orthodox ===
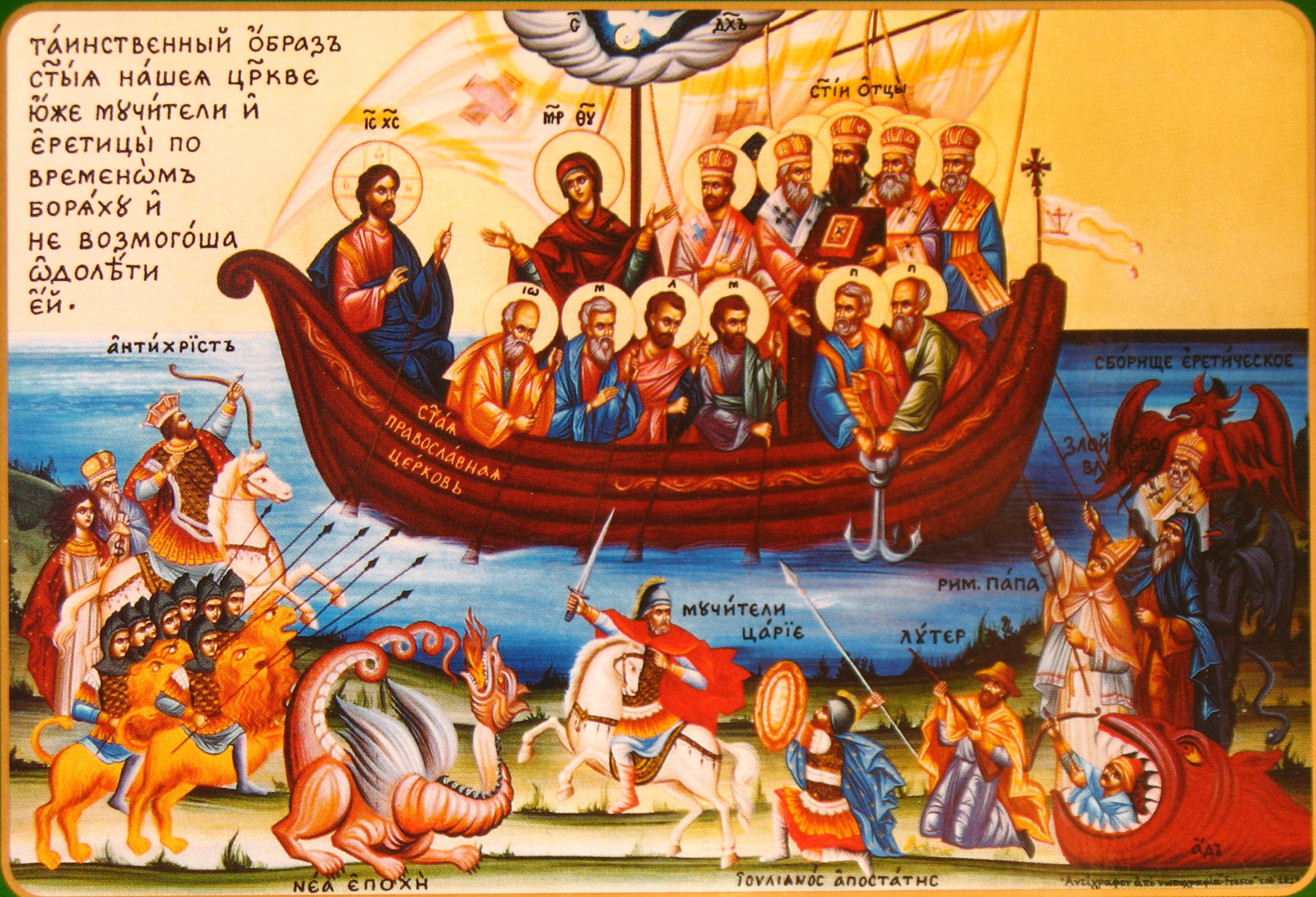
1817 Fresco from Zograf monastery in Mount Athos, Greece.

The Eastern Orthodox Church utilises the similar Ark of Salvation in its iconography as a representation of the Church.

== Modern usage ==
=== Coat of Arms ===
- Archdiocese of Vancouver
- City of Paris

=== Flags ===
- Flag of Paris

== Coelum Stellatum Christianum ==
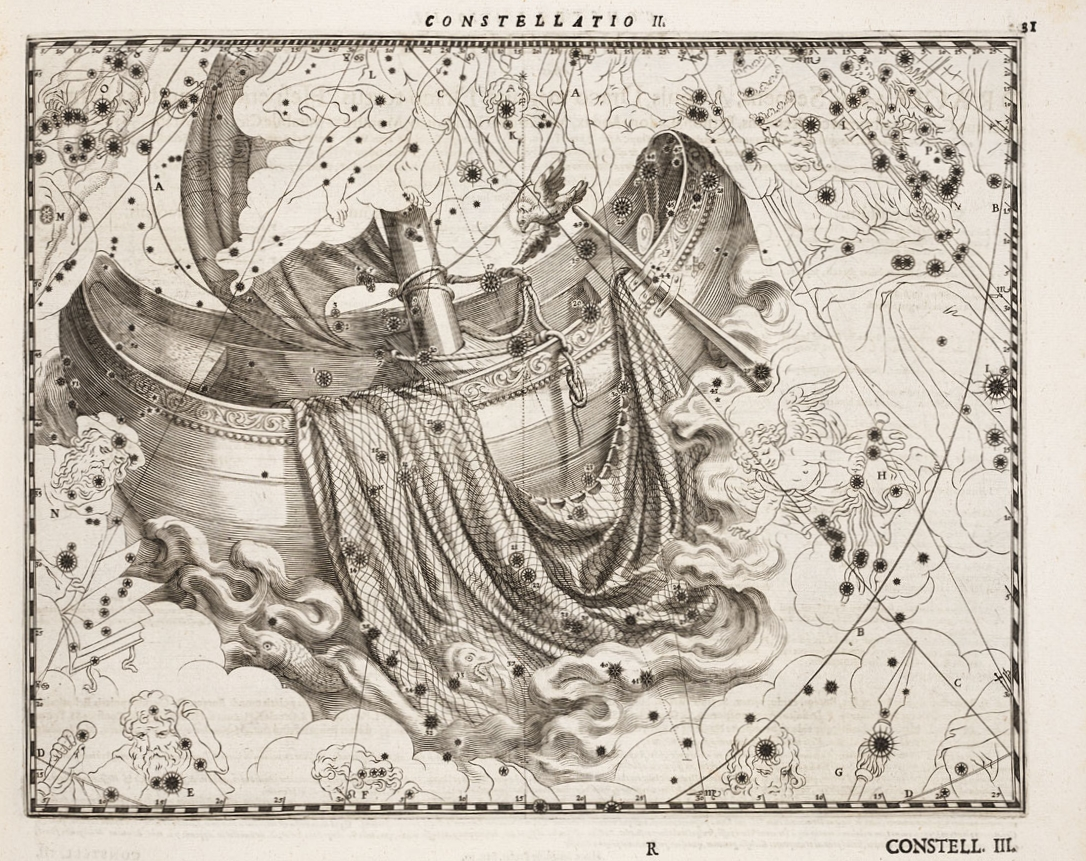
1627 Barque of St. Peter as a constellation in Julius Schiller's Coelum Stellatum Christianum

1627 AD Julius Schiller in his book Coelum Stellatum Christianum attempted to Christianise the constellations. Schiller depicted Ursa Major as the Barque of St. Peter.
