= Flag of France =

French Republic
- Tricolore
- Use: National flag
- Proportion: 2∶3
- Adopted: 15 February 1794; 232 years ago (Note: Use has not been continuous: readopted in 1830 after a 15 year gap, last re-adopted on 5 March 1848 after a few days.)
- Design: A vertical tricolour of blue, white, and red
- Designed by: Jacques-Louis David
- Use: Reverse flag
- Proportion: 2∶3
- Adopted: 1790
- Design: A vertical tricolour of red, white, and blue
- Use: National flag
- Proportion: 2∶3
- Adopted: 1974
- Design: An interchangeable variant of the national flag with lighter shades (lighter variant on 28 February 2020)

The national flag of France (French: drapeau national de la France) is a tricolour featuring three vertical bands coloured blue (hoist side), white, and red. The design was adopted during the French Revolution and has remained the national flag since then, with only minor variations in shade and proportion. The tricolour scheme was later adopted by many other nations in Europe and elsewhere, and, according to the Encyclopædia Britannica, has historically stood "in symbolic opposition to the autocratic and clericalist royal standards of the past".

Before the tricolour was adopted the royal government used many flags, the best known being a blue shield and gold fleurs-de-lis (the Royal Arms of France) on a white background, or state flag. Early in the French Revolution, the Paris militia, which played a prominent role in the storming of the Bastille, wore a cockade of blue and red, the city's traditional colours. According to French general Gilbert du Motier, Marquis de Lafayette, white was the "ancient French colour" and was added to the militia cockade to form a tricolour, or national, cockade of France.

This cockade became part of the uniform of the National Guard, which succeeded the militia and was commanded by Lafayette. The colours and design of the cockade are the basis of the Tricolour flag, adopted in 1790, originally with the red nearest to the flagpole and the blue farthest from it. A modified design by Jacques-Louis David was adopted in 1794. The royal white flag was used during the Bourbon Restoration from 1815 to 1830; the tricolour was brought back after the July Revolution and has been used since then, except for an interruption for a few days in 1848. Since 1974, there have been two versions of the flag in varying levels of use by the state: the original (identifiable by its use of navy blue) and one with a lighter shade of blue. Since July 2020, France has used the older variant by default, including at the Élysée Palace.

== Design ==
Article 2 of the French constitution of 1958 states that "the national emblem is the tricolour flag, blue, white, red". No law has specified the shades of these official colours. In English blazon, the flag is described as tierced in pale azure, argent and gules.

The blue stripe has usually been a dark navy blue; a lighter blue (and lighter red) version was introduced in 1974 by President Valéry Giscard d'Estaing. Both versions were used from then; town halls, public buildings and barracks usually fly the darker version of the flag, but the lighter version was sometimes used even on official State buildings.

On 13 July 2020, President Emmanuel Macron reverted, without any statement and with no orders for other institutions to use a specific version, to the darker hue for the presidential Élysée Palace, as a symbol of the French Revolution. The move was met with comments both in favour of and against the change, but it was noted that both the darker and lighter flags have been in use for decades.

A comparison of the lighter and darker versions of the flag

Authority	Scheme	Blue	White	Red
Government of France	Pantone	Blue 072 C		485 C
Government of France	CMYK	100.90.20.7	0.0.0.0	0.100.100.0
Government of France	RGB	(0,0,145)	(255,255,255)	(225,0,15)
Government of France	HEX	#000091	#FFFFFF	#E1000F
Ministry of Defense	AFNOR; NFX 08002	A 503	A 665	A 805
Embassy to Germany (lighter colours)	Pantone	Reflex blue	Safe	Red 032
Embassy to Germany (lighter colours)	CMYK	100.80.0.0	0.0.0.0	0.100.100.0
Embassy to Germany (lighter colours)	RGB	(0,85,164)	(255,255,255)	(239,65,53)
Embassy to Germany (lighter colours)	HEX	#0055A4	#FFFFFF	#EF4135

Currently, the flag is one and a half times as wide as its height (i.e. in the proportion 2:3) and, except in the French Navy, has stripes of equal width. Initially, the three stripes of the flag were not equally wide, being in the proportions 30 (blue), 33 (white) and 37 (red). Under Napoleon I, the proportions were changed to make the stripes' width equal, but by a regulation dated 17 May 1853, the navy went back to using the 30:33:37 proportions, which it now continues to use, as the flapping of the flag makes portions farther from the halyard seem smaller.

Flag used as a photographic backdrop

When the French president or prime minister is expected to be photographed at an official or televised event, a flag with a much narrower white stripe is often used as a backdrop to ensure that all three stripes are visible when the cameras are focused on them, as using a flag with equal stripes might show only the white stripe in frame.

== Symbolism ==
Blue and red are the traditional colours of Paris, used on the city's coat of arms. Blue is identified with Saint Martin, red with Saint Denis. At the storming of the Bastille in 1789, the Paris militia wore blue and red cockades on their hats. White had long featured prominently on French flags and is described as the "ancient French colour" by Lafayette. White was added to the "revolutionary" colours of the militia cockade to "nationalise" the design, thus forming the cockade of France. Although Lafayette identified the white stripe with the nation, other posterior accounts, notably from July Monarchy, identify it with the monarchy. Lafayette denied that the flag contains any reference to the red-and-white livery of the Duc d'Orléans. Despite this, Orléanists adopted the tricolour as their own.

Blue and red are associated with the Virgin Mary, the patroness of France, and were the colours of the oriflamme. The colours of the French flag may also represent the three main estates of the Ancien Régime (the clergy: white, the nobility: red and the bourgeoisie: blue). Blue, as the symbol of class, comes first and red, representing the nobility, comes last. Both extreme colours are situated on each side of white referring to a superior order.

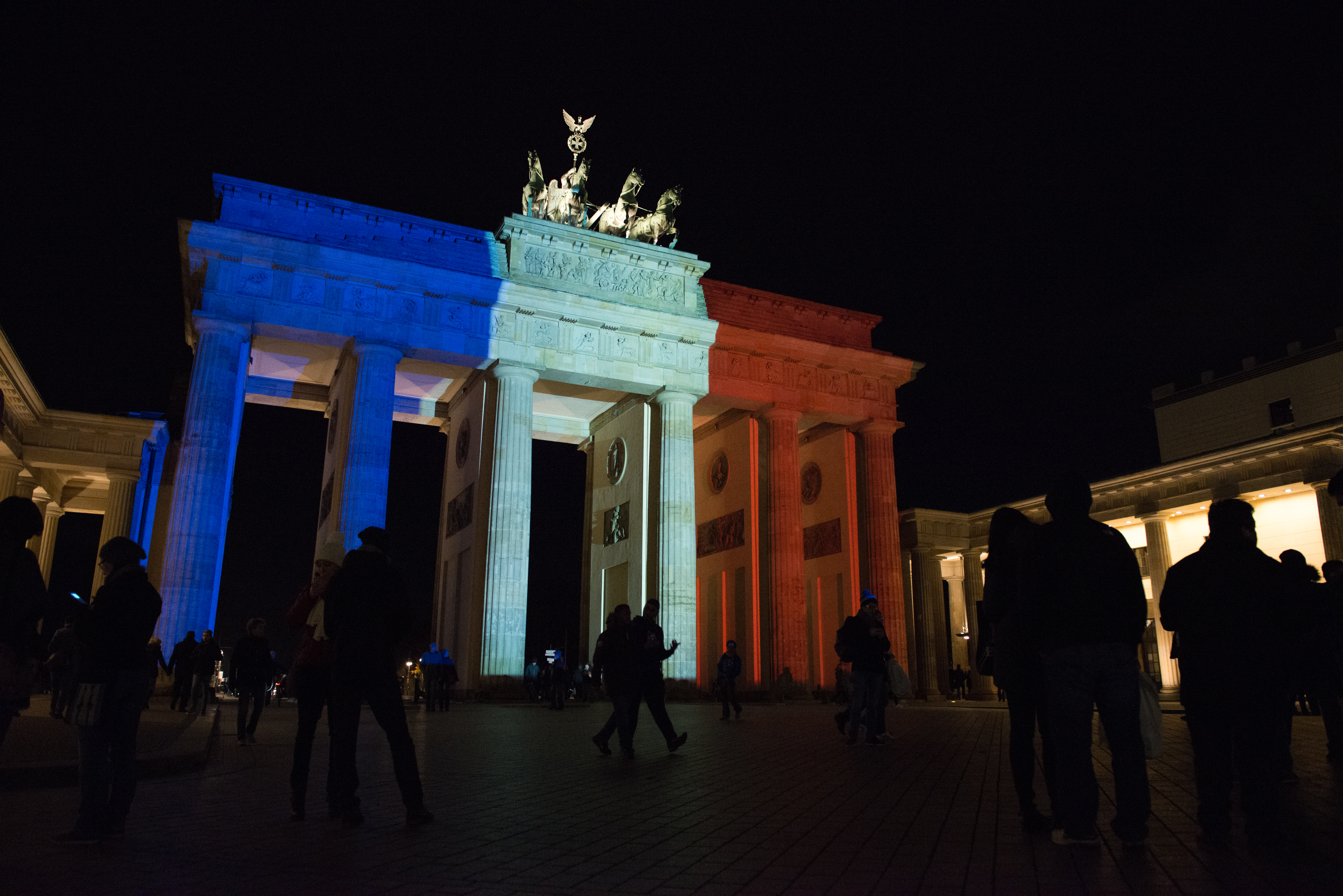
The Brandenburg Gate in Berlin was one of many world landmarks illuminated in the French flag colours after the November 2015 Paris attacks.

The cockade of France was adopted in July 1789, a moment of national unity that soon faded. Royalists began wearing white cockades and flying white flags, while the Jacobins, and later the Socialists, flew the red flag. The tricolour, which combines royalist white with republican red, came to be seen as a symbol of moderation and of a nationalism that transcended factionalism.

The French government website states that the white field was the colour of the king, while blue and red were the colours of Paris.

The three colours are occasionally taken to represent the three elements of the revolutionary motto, liberté (freedom: blue), égalité (equality: white), fraternité (brotherhood: red); this symbolism was referenced in Krzysztof Kieślowski's three colours film trilogy, for example.

In the aftermath of the November 2015 Paris attacks, many famous landmarks and stadiums around the world were illuminated in the flag colours to honour the victims.

== History ==
=== Kingdom of France ===
During the early Middle Ages, the oriflamme, the flag of Saint Denis, was used—red, with two, three, or five spikes. Originally, it was the royal banner under the Capetians. It was stored in Saint-Denis abbey, where it was taken when war broke out. French kings went forth into battle preceded either by Saint Martin's red cape, which was supposed to protect the monarch, or by the red banner of Saint Denis.

Later during the Middle Ages, these colours came to be associated with the reigning house of France. In 1328, the coat-of-arms of the House of Valois was blue with gold fleurs-de-lis bordered in red. From this time on, the kings of France were represented in vignettes and manuscripts wearing a red gown under a blue coat decorated with gold fleurs-de-lis. Charles V of France changed the design from an all-over scattering of fleurs-de-lis to a group of three in about 1376; these two coats are known in heraldic terminology as France Ancient and France Modern, respectively.

During the Hundred Years' War, England was recognised by a red cross; Burgundy, a red saltire; and France, a white cross. This cross could figure either on a blue or a red field. The blue field eventually became the common standard for French armies. The French regiments were later assigned the white cross as standard, with their proper colours in the cantons. The French flag of a white cross on a blue field is still seen on some flags derived from it, such as that of Quebec.

The flag of Joan of Arc during the Hundred Years' War is described in her own words, "I had a banner of which the field was sprinkled with lilies; the world was painted there, with an angel at each side; it was white of the white cloth called 'boccassin'; there was written above it, I believe, 'JHESUS MARIA'; it was fringed with silk." Joan's standard led to the prominent use of white on later French flags.

From the accession of the Bourbons to the throne of France, the green ensign of the navy became a plain white flag, the symbol of purity and royal authority. The merchant navy was assigned "the old flag of the nation of France", the white cross on a blue field. There also was a red jack for the French galleys. A variant of the plain white Bourbon banner, a white field strewn with gold fleur de lis, was also sometimes seen.

The Oriflamme, the banner of the Capetians

Flag of France under the Capetian dynasty since the twelfth century

Flag of France under the Capetian dynasty since the fourteenth century

The Royal Banner of France or "Bourbon Flag". The House of Bourbon ruled France from 1589 to 1792 and again from 1815 to 1848.

The Royal Standard of France (1643 design)

Variant royal standard of France (1643 design)

Variant royal standard of France (1643 design)

The Royal Standard of France (1814 design)

=== The Tricolore ===
The national flag of France at the Arc de Triomphe

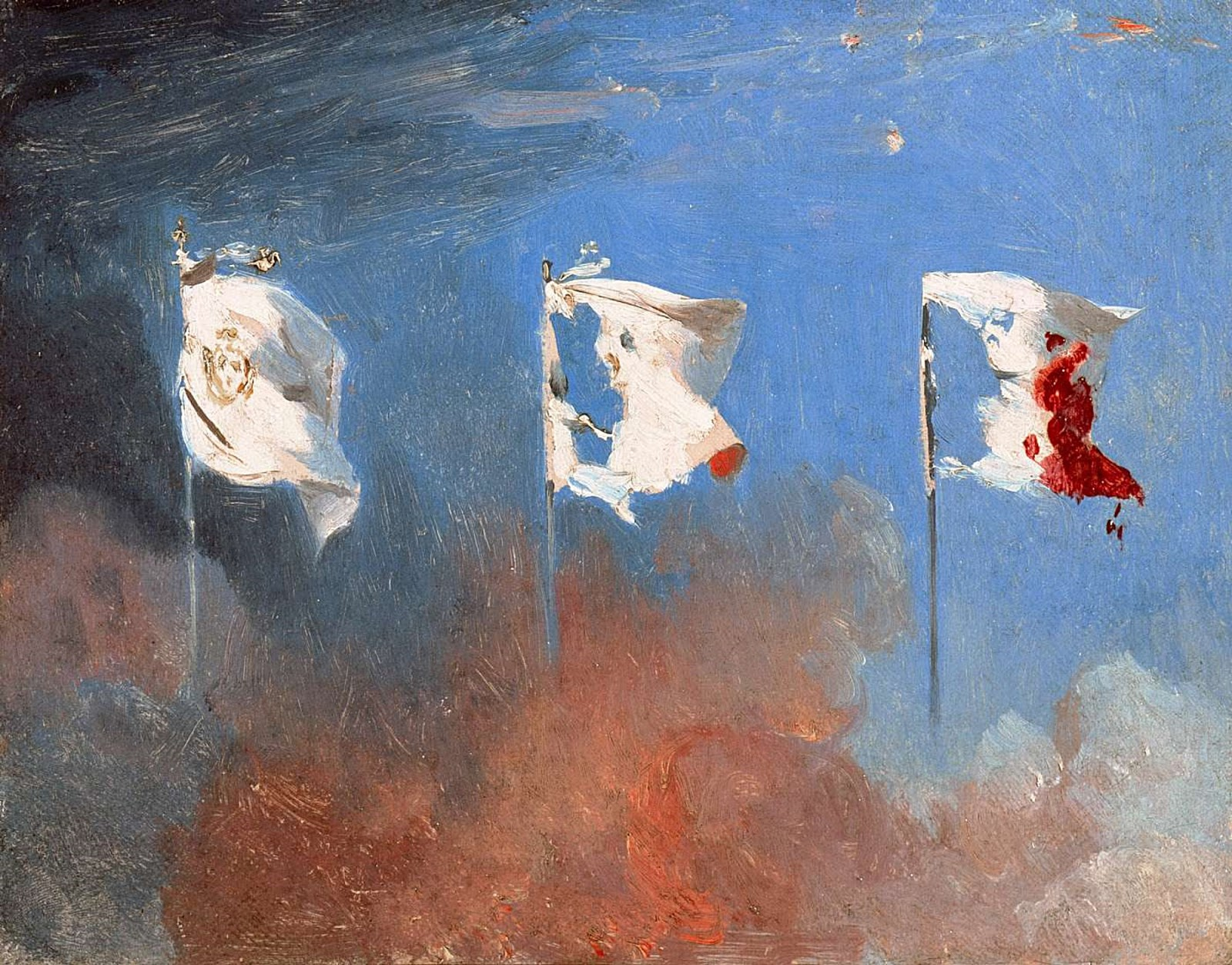
The white flag of the monarchy transformed into the Tricolore as a result of the July Revolution. Scenes of July 1830, painting by Léon Cogniet (1830)

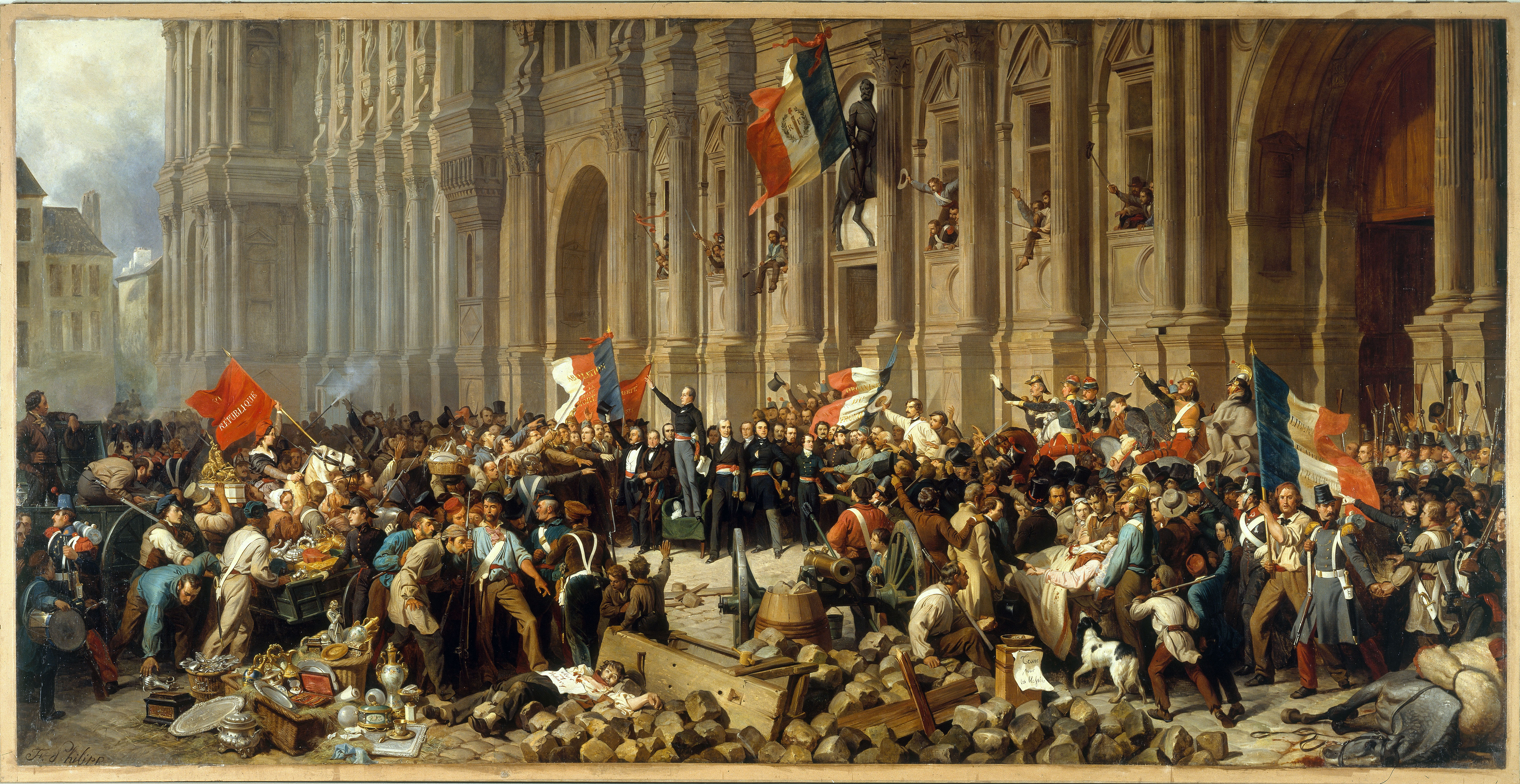
Lamartine Rejecting the Red Flag in Front of the City Hall by Henri Felix Emmanuel Philippoteaux, 1848

Adopted after the French Revolution, the French tricolour flag evolved from revolutionary symbols like the blue and red cockade of France. These were circular rosette-like emblems attached to the hat. Camille Desmoulins asked his followers to wear green cockades on 12 July 1789. The Paris militia, formed on 13 July, adopted a blue and red cockade. Blue and red are the traditional colours of Paris, and they are used on the city's coat of arms. The addition of white has been attributed to Lafayette, Mayor Jean Sylvain Bailly, and even Louis XVI himself. This episode is supposed to have taken place on July 17, 1789, on the occasion of the king's visit to the Paris city hall. However, it is proven that the tricolor cockade began to be worn, by order of the city, from the 13th or 14 July. In any case, Louis XVI actually went to the Paris city hall where he received the tricolor cockade. On 27 July, a tricolour cockade was adopted as part of the uniform of the National Guard, the national police force that succeeded the militia.

A drapeau tricolore with vertical red, white and blue stripes was approved by the Constituent Assembly on 24 October 1790. Simplified designs were used to illustrate how the revolution had broken with the past. The order was reversed to blue-white-red, the current design, by a resolution passed on 15 February 1794.

When the Bourbon dynasty was restored following the defeat of Napoleon in 1815, the tricolore—with its revolutionary connotations—was replaced by a white flag, the pre-revolutionary naval flag. However, following the July Revolution of 1830, the "citizen-king", Louis-Philippe, restored the tricolore, and it has remained France's national flag since that time.

Following the overthrow of Napoleon III, voters elected a royalist majority to the National Assembly of the new Third Republic. This parliament then offered the throne to the Bourbon pretender, Henri, Comte de Chambord. However, he insisted that he would accept the throne only on the condition that the tricolour be replaced by the white flag. As the tricolour had become a cherished national symbol, this demand proved impossible to accommodate. Plans to restore the monarchy were adjourned and ultimately dropped, and France has remained a republic, with the tricolour flag, ever since.

The Vichy régime, which dropped the word "republic" in favour of "the French state", maintained the use of the tricolore, but Philippe Pétain used as his personal standard a version of the flag with, in the white stripe, an axe made with a star-studded marshal's baton. This axe is called the "Francisque" in reference to the ancient Frankish throwing axe. During this same period, the Free French Forces used a tricolore with, in the white stripe, a red Cross of Lorraine.

The constitutions of 1946 and 1958 instituted the "blue, white, and red" flag as the national emblem of the Republic.

The colours of the national flag are occasionally said to represent different flowers; blue represents cornflowers, white represents marguerites, and red represents poppies.

The flag of Paris, source of the tricolour's blue and red stripes

The cockade of France, designed in July 1789. White was added to "nationalise" an earlier blue and red design.

The flag of France used from 1790 until 1794

The flag of France used from 1794 (interrupted in 1815–1830 and in 1848)

The French Second Republic adopted a variant of the tricolour for a few days between 24 February and 5 March 1848.

The French tricolore with the royal crown and fleur-de-lys was possibly designed by the Henri, Count of Chambord, in his younger years as a compromise, but which was never made official, and which he himself rejected when offered the throne in 1870.

From 1912 onwards, the French Air Force originated the use of roundels on military aircraft shortly before World War I. Similar national cockades, with different ordering of colours, were later adopted as aircraft roundels by their allies.

Personal standard of Philippe Pétain, as Chief of Vichy France.

Flag used by the Free French Forces during World War II; in the centre is the Cross of Lorraine; later, the personal standard of President Charles de Gaulle, as Chief of Free France.

The flag of France, darker red and blue variant.

The flag of France, lighter red and blue variant.

== Regimental flags ==
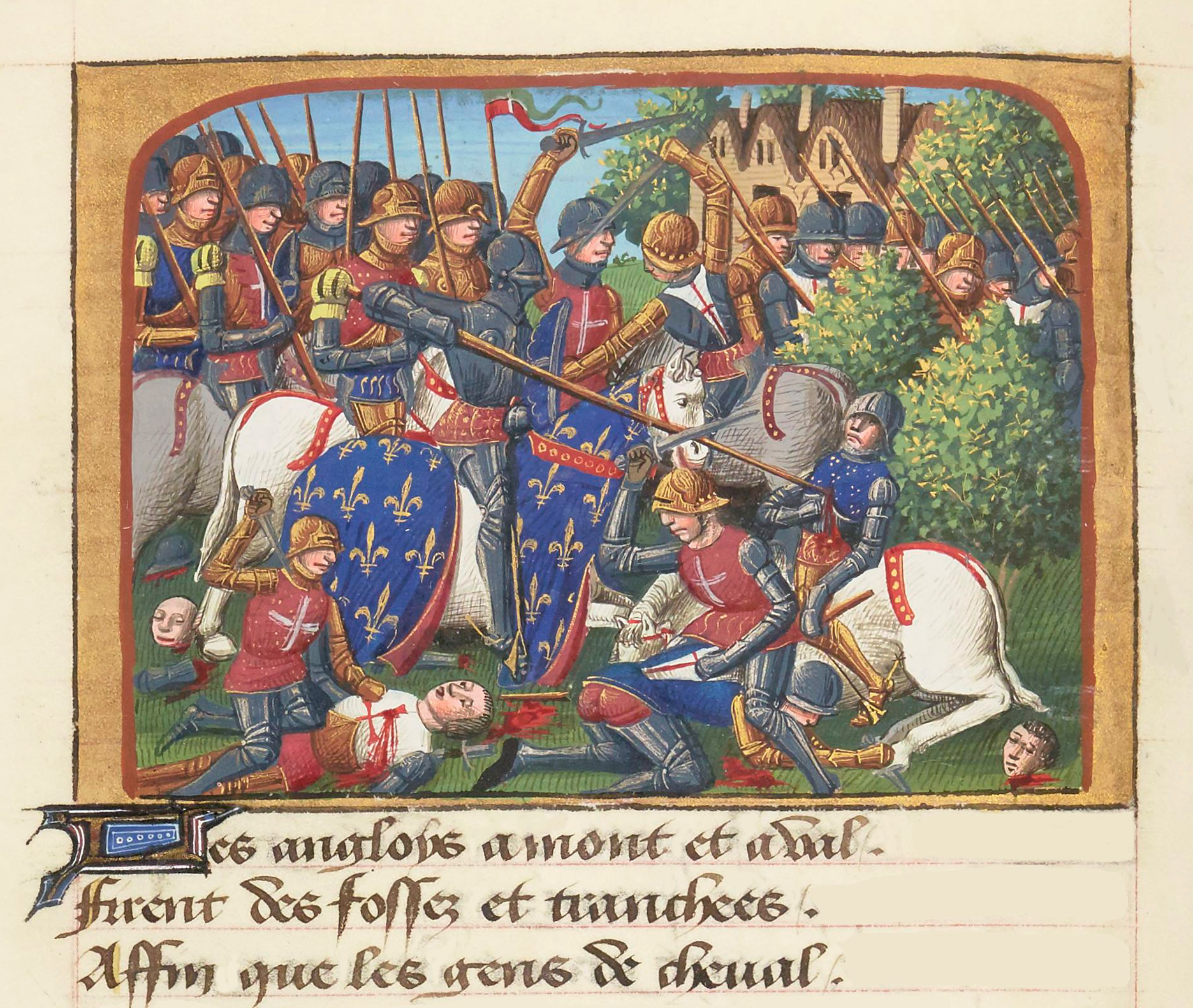
The French soldiers started to use white crosses, during the Hundred Years' War, to distinguish themselves from the English soldiers wearing red crosses.

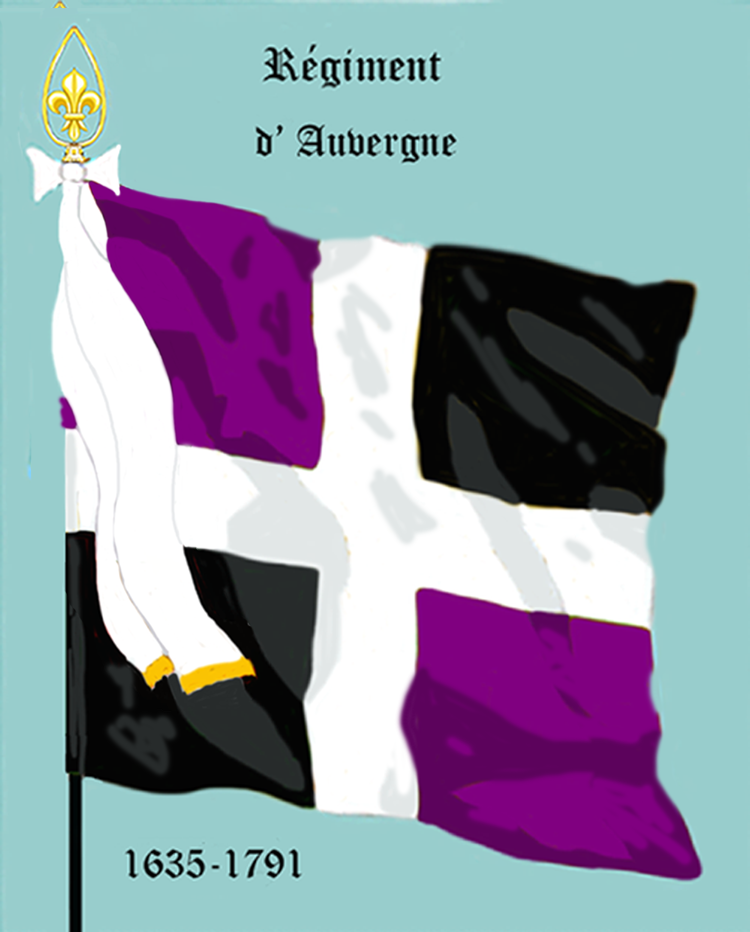
A white-crossed regimental flag during the Ancien Régime (here, Régiment d'Auvergne)

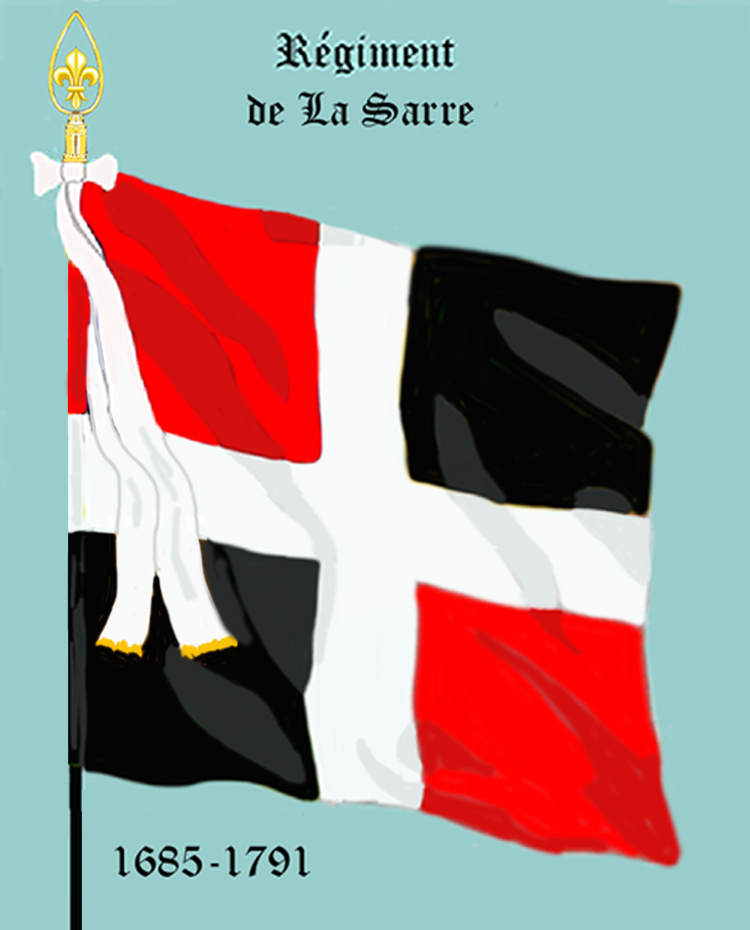
La Sarre Regiment (Régiment de la Sarre)

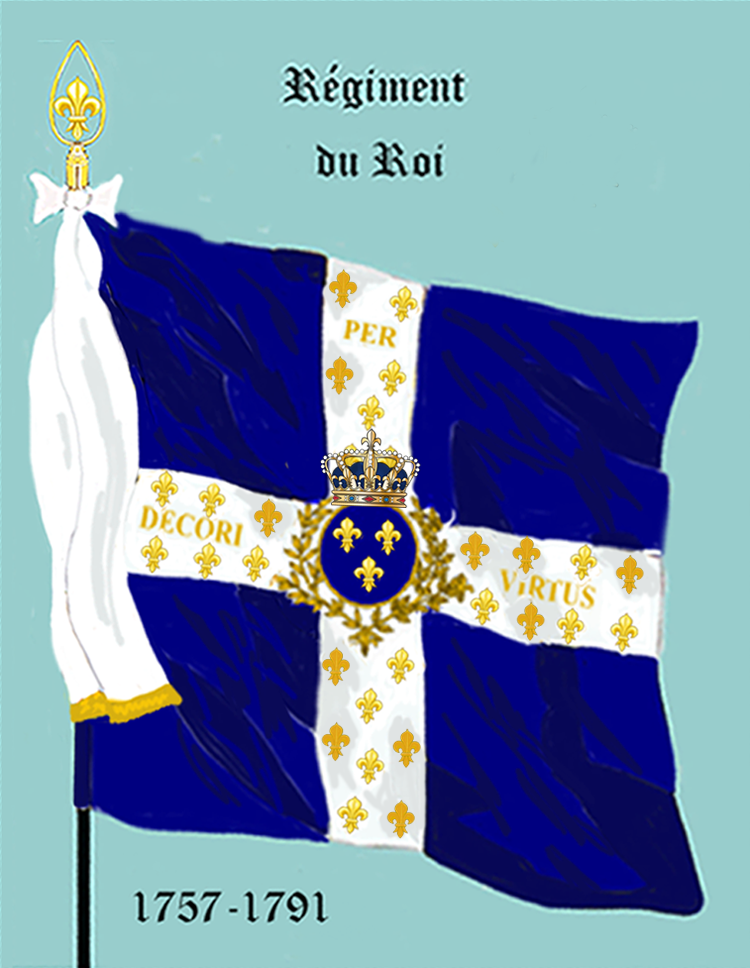
King's Regiment (Régiment du Roi)

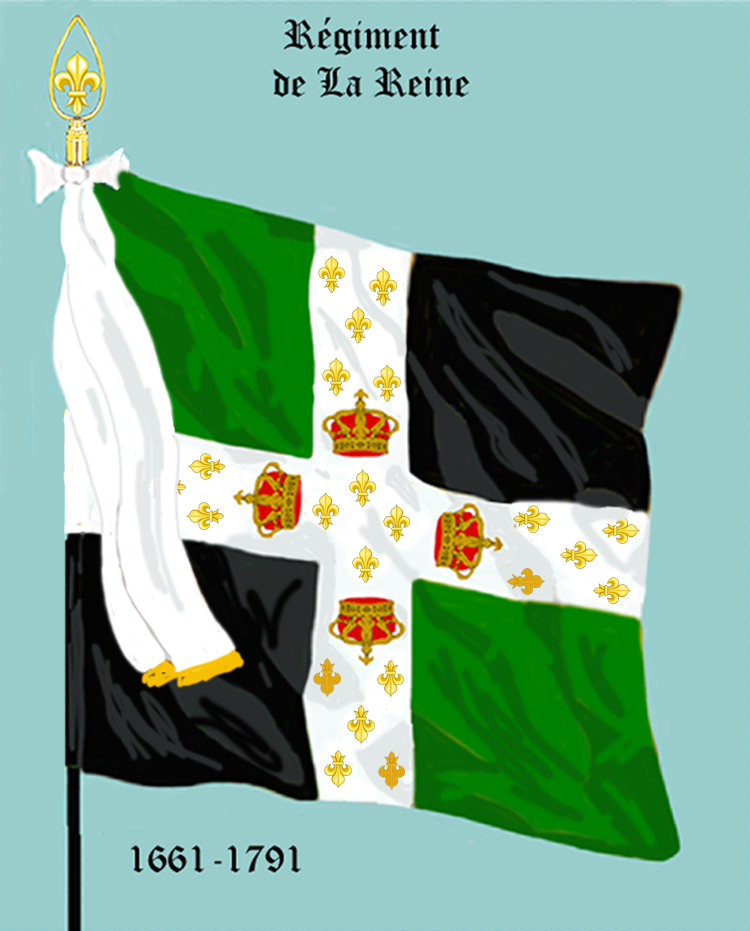
Queen's Regiment (Régiment de la Reine)

General Lévis' Regiment Flag in North America. Now official flag of the city of Lévis, Quebec

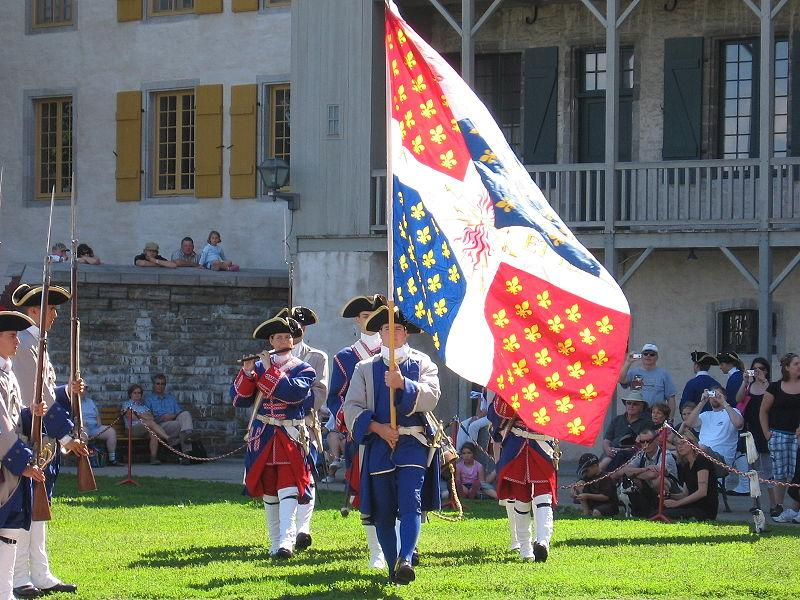
The pre-revolutionary regimental flags inspired the flag of Quebec (here, the Compagnies Franches de la Marine).

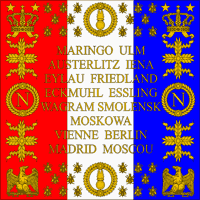
Regimental flag of the 1st Regiment of Grenadiers of the French Imperial Guard (1812)

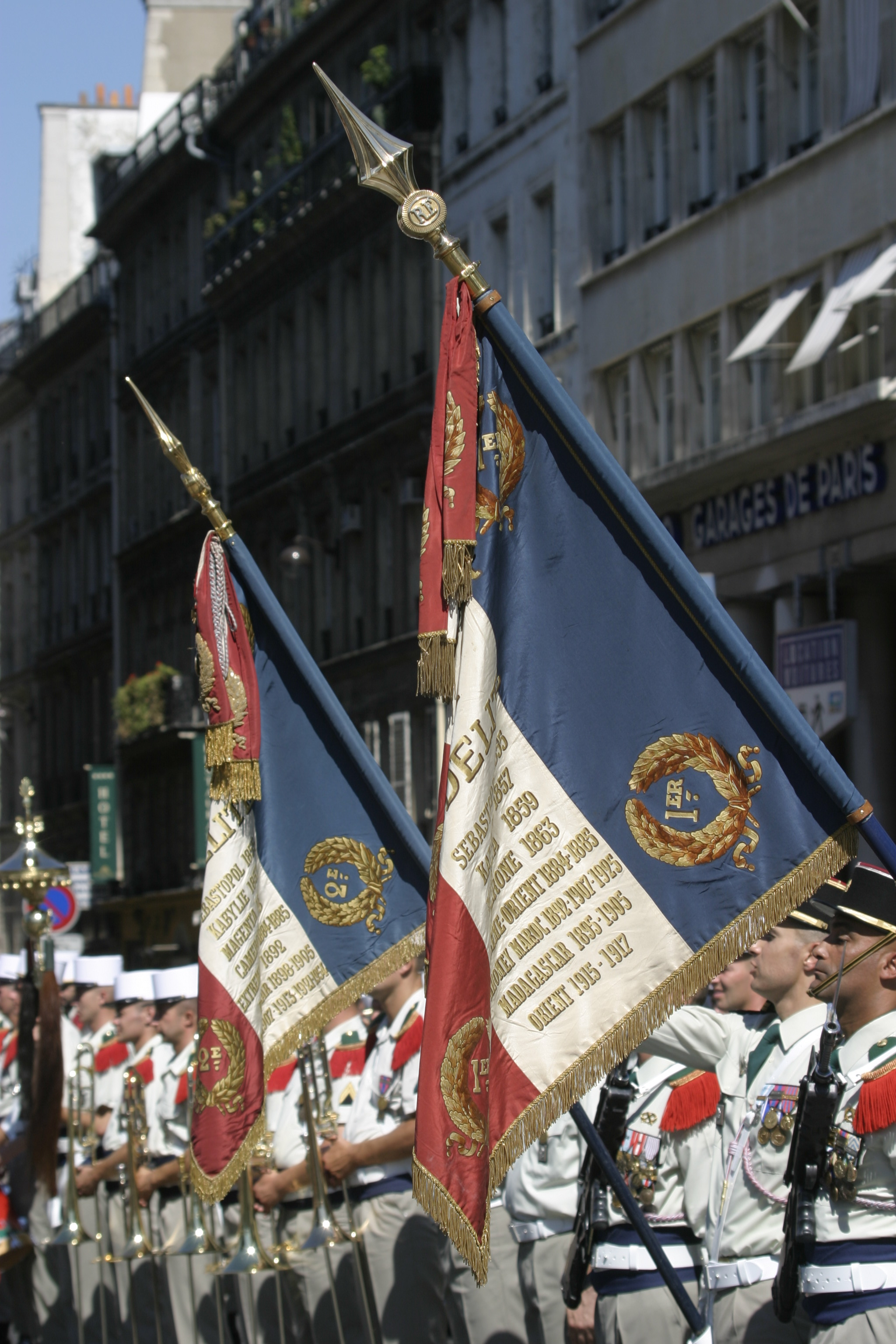
Current regimental flags of the 1st and 2nd Regiments of the Légion étrangère

== Naval flags ==
Naval ensign prior to 1789 and 1814–1830.

The merchant flag of France (1689 design)

The present ensign of France introduced on 17 May 1853

== Colonial flags ==
Most French colonies either used the regular tricolour or a regional flag without the French flag. There were some exceptions:

Flag of Tonkin (French protectorate) and Annam in French Indochina

Flag of Laos in French Indochina

Flag of the Sip Song Chau Tai, French Indochina (1948–1955)

Flag of French Sudan (1958–1959), present-day Mali

Flag of French Togoland (1956–1960), present-day Togo

Flag of Gabon (1959–1960)

Flag of Madagascar under French protection (1885–1895)

Merchant flag of the French protectorate of Morocco (1912–1956)

Flag used by some military units based in the French protectorate of Tunisia

Briefly used flag of the French Mandate of Syria and the Lebanon in 1920

Flag of the State of Aleppo, in the French Mandate of Syria (1920–1924)

Flag of the State of Damascus, in the French Mandate of Syria (1920–1924)

Flag of the State of Syria, in the French Mandate of Syria (1924–1930)

Flag of the State of Alawites, in the French Mandate of Syria

Flag of Jabal ad-Druze, in the French Mandate of Syria

Flag of the State of Greater Lebanon during the French mandate 1920–1943

Flag of Republic of Independent Guyana (1886–1887)

Unofficial flag of Saint Barthélemy

Flag of the French Protectorate of Wallis and Futuna (Uvea) (1860–1886)

Present unofficial flag of Wallis and Futuna

Flag of the Kingdom of Tahiti under the Protectorate of France (1845–1880)

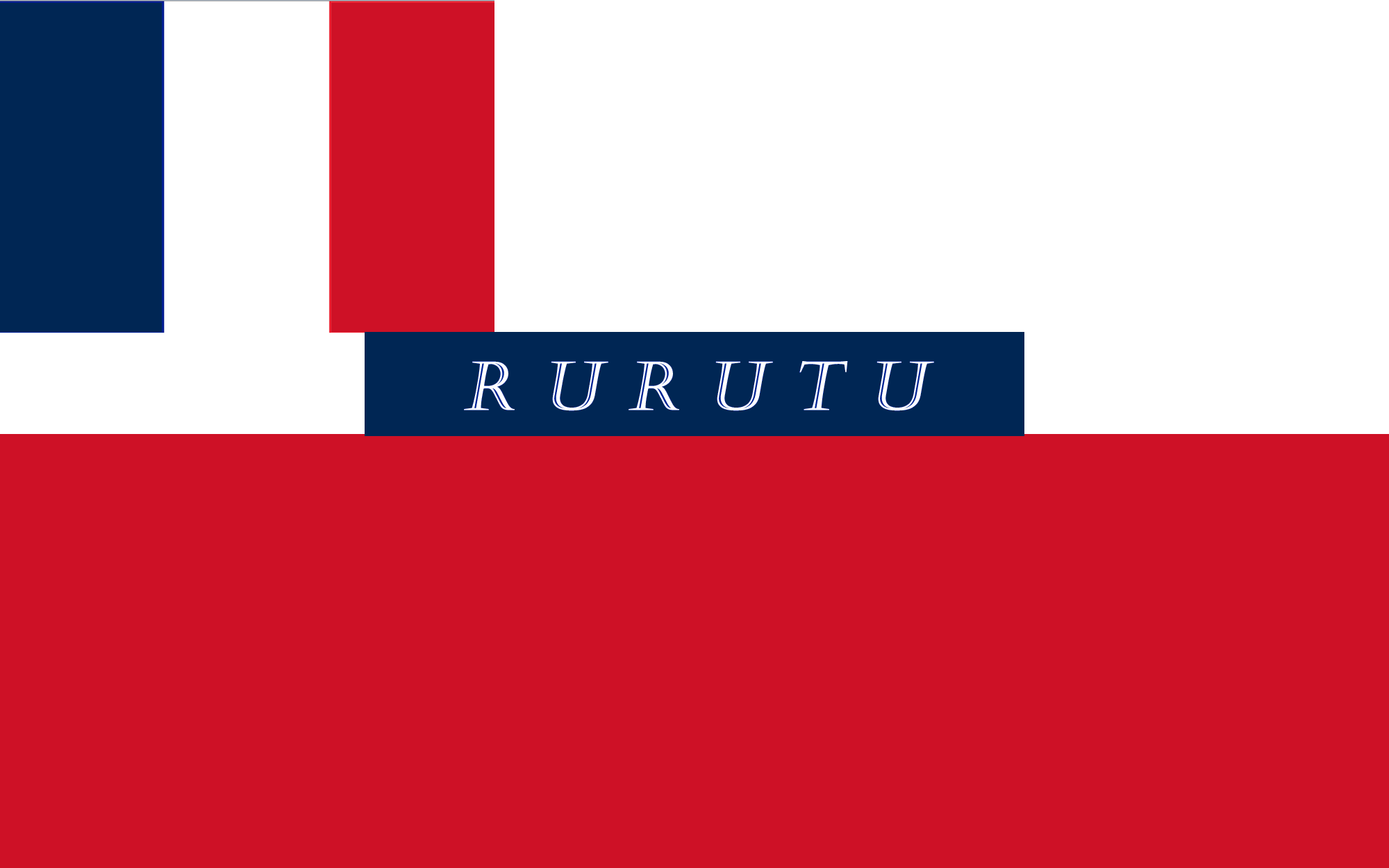
Flag of the French protectorate of Rurutu in French Polynesia (1858–1889)

Flag of French Polynesia

Flag of the French protectorate of Saar (1947–1956)

Flag of the French colonial governor

Flag of the French Southern and Antarctic Lands

Unofficial flag of Louisiana (1861)

== Gallery ==
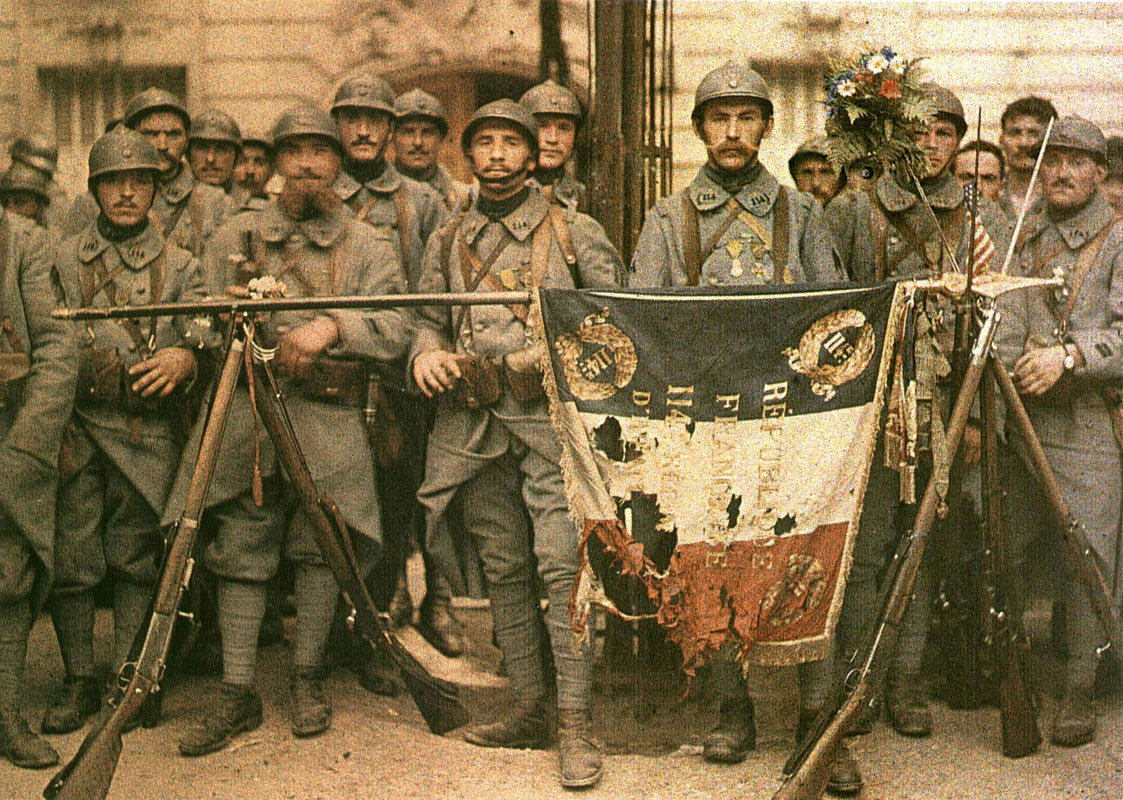
French regimental flag, Paris, autochrome dated 1917

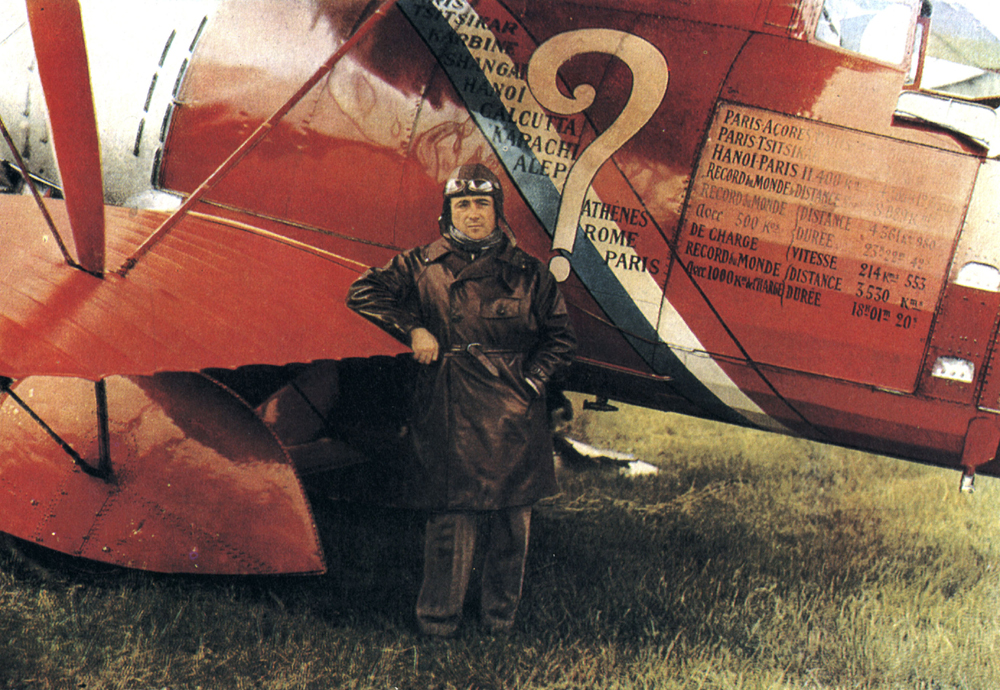
Flag of France, color photography dated 1930

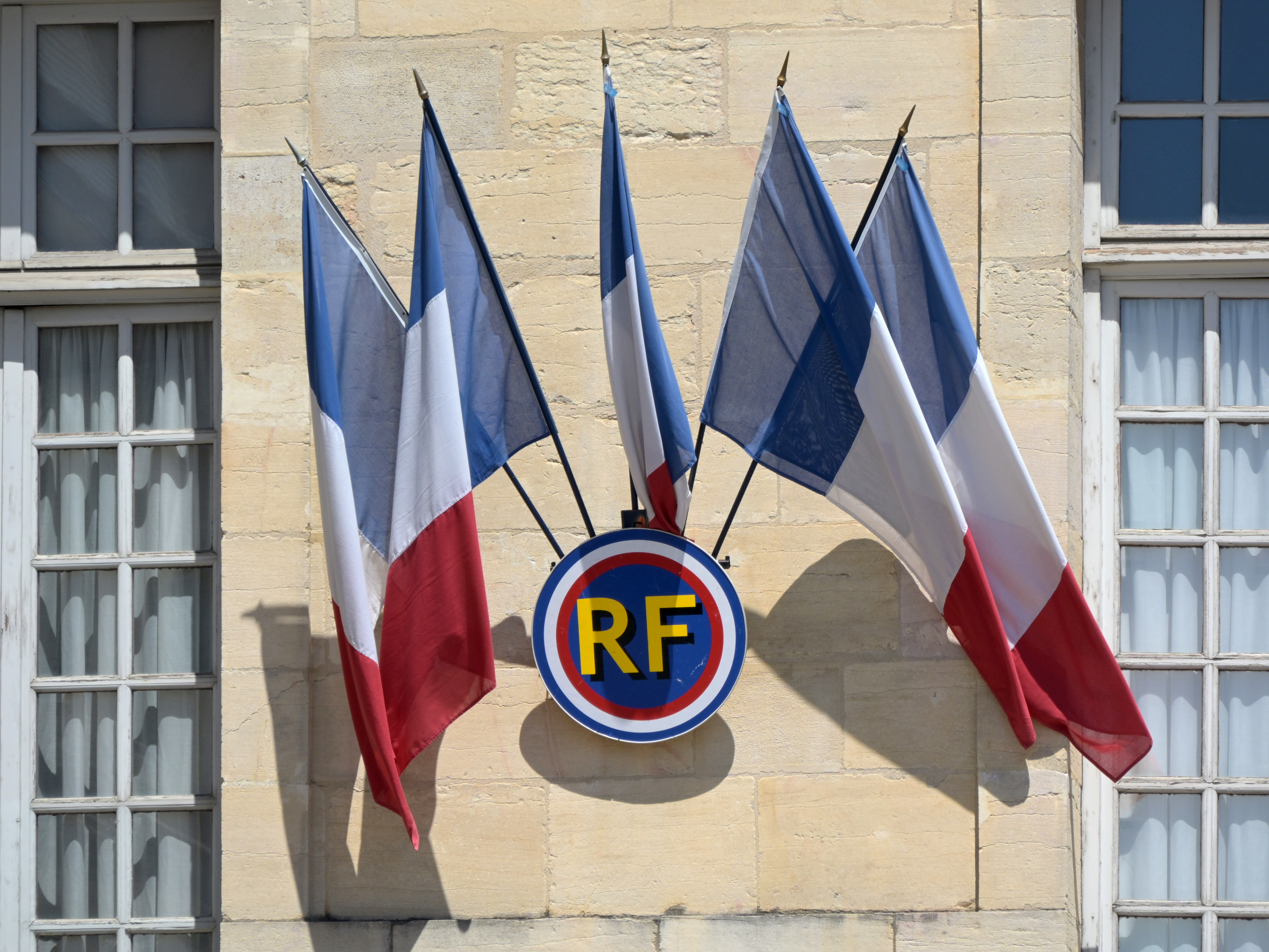
Multiple French flags as commonly flown from public buildings

== See also ==
- Armorial of France
- Flag of Haiti, based on French Republican flag
- Flag of Paraguay, inspired by the colours of the French Tricolour
- Flags of the regions of France
- List of French flags
- Coat of arms of France
- Somoto, Nicaragua, has a flag of similar design

== Sources ==
- Chisholm, Hugh, ed. (1911). "Flag" . Encyclopædia Britannica. Vol. 10 (11th ed.). Cambridge University Press. pp. 454–463.
- Ripley, George; Dana, Charles A., eds. (1879). "Flag". The American Cyclopædia. Vol. 8. p. 250.
- "The Vinkhuijzen collection of military uniforms: France, 1750–1757". New York Public Library. 25 March 2011 [2004]. Archived from the original on 6 April 2015.
