= Flag of Paris =

Flag of the capital of France

Paris
- Parisian flag with the coat of arms
- Proportion: 2:3
- Adopted: 20th century
- Design: Vertical bicolour consisting of blue and red
- Designed by: Unknown
- Variant of the Parisian bicolor without the coat of arms.
- Proportion: 1:1
- Adopted: 18th century

The flag of Paris is vertically divided between the traditional colours of Paris, blue and red, both of which also feature in the city's coat of arms. Red is identified with Saint Denis (a martyr who shed blood), blue with Saint Martin (a bishop).

The colours of Paris are the origin of the blue and red stripes in the flag of France, while the white stripe originally symbolised the monarchy. The French flag's colours were adopted as a cockade during the early stages of the French Revolution, when the country was still in the process of becoming a constitutional monarchy.

== Other flags ==
Flag of the mayor of Paris

== See also ==
- Coat of arms of Paris
