= Coat of arms of Paris =

Versions
- Escutcheon-only
- Armiger: City of Paris
- Adopted: 1358
- Shield: Gules, on waves of the sea in base a ship in full sail Argent, a chief Azure semé-de-lis Or
- Motto: Fluctuat nec mergitur (She is tossed by the waves, but does not sink)
- Order(s): Legion of Honor; Order of Liberation; Croix de Guerre
- Other elements: Above the shield a mural crown Or

The coat of arms of Paris (French: blason de Paris) shows a silver sailing ship on waves of the sea in a red field, with a chief showing the royal fleurs-de-lis. Originally introduced in the 14th century, its current form dates to 1853. The city motto is Fluctuat nec mergitur ("[She] is tossed [by the waves], but does not sink"). The traditional colors of the city of Paris are red and blue.

== History ==
The Marchands de l'eau (hanse parisienne des marchands de l'eau) were a corporation or guild established by royal privilege in 1170 with the right for commercial navigation on the Seine between Paris and Mantes. Their seal in c. 1210 showed a river boat. By the mid-14th century, the members of the guild, known as the hansés, became the most influential faction in the city, and their emblem, now represented as a sailing-vessel bearing the royal fleur-de-lis as its emblem, came to be used as the city coat of arms. The first recorded use of the coat of arms dates to 1358. The city colors of red and blue also date to 1358, introduced by Étienne Marcel. In the 15th century, the coat of arms is shown as a red a ship argent (without the waves) with the Capetian arms in chief, at the time azure, three fleurs-de-lis or. The use of semé-de-lis (France ancien) is attested for the early 16th century.

When the French Revolution abolished the nobility by the decree of 20 June 1790, it simultaneously disallowed all emblems or coats of arms. The municipality of Paris quickly complied, and abolished its own arms in November of that same year.

It was not until the First French Empire that new cities were officially allowed to have arms. For Paris, this resulted in the Letters Patent granted to the city of Paris by Napoleon on 29 January 1811. In the Letters Patent of Louis XVIII in 1817, the coat of arms of Paris was restored in its traditional form, except for the chief, where the fleur-de-lis were replaced by the three bees used by Napoleon (attributed to the Merovingian kings, especially Childeric I).

The July Monarchy re-introduced the old (pre-revolutionary) coat of arms. Under the French Second Republic (1848–1852), the fleurs-de-lis were replaced by stars.

Under the Second French Empire, the old coat-of-arms was once again restored. The motto Fluctuat nec mergitur dates to the same time, officially introduced by a decree dated 24 November 1853, by Baron Haussmann, then prefect of the Seine. It has been part of the full coat of arms since that time.

Additions made to the full achievement of the coat of arms in modern times include three badges, for:

- the Legion of Honor (decree of 9 October 1900);
- the Croix de Guerre 1914-1918 (Decree of 28 July 1919);
- the Order of Liberation (decree of 24 March 1945).
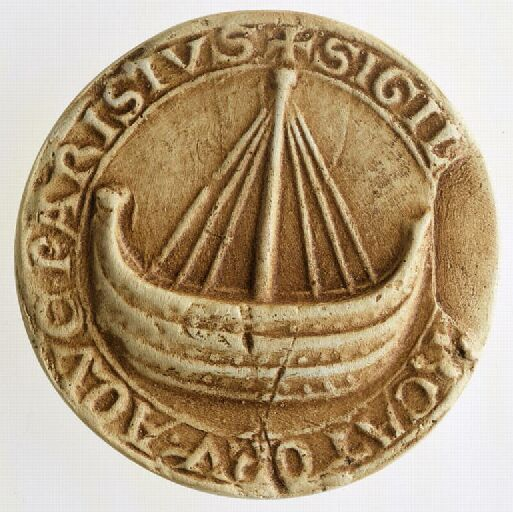
Seal of the marchands de l'eau, c. 1210 (SIGIL[LVM ME]RCATORVM AQVE PARISIVS)

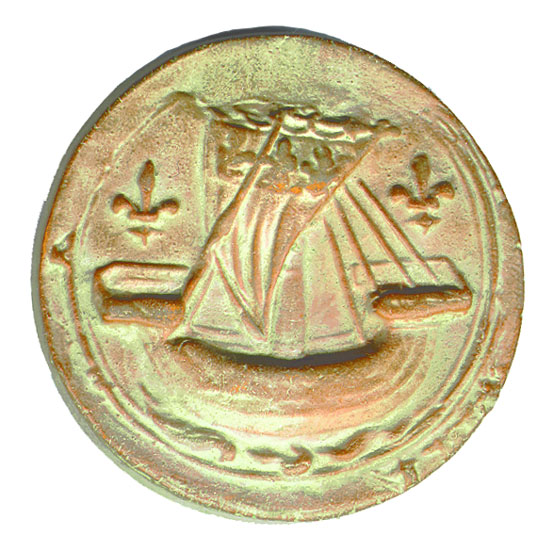
Seal dated 1412, showing a ship with two fleur-de-lis

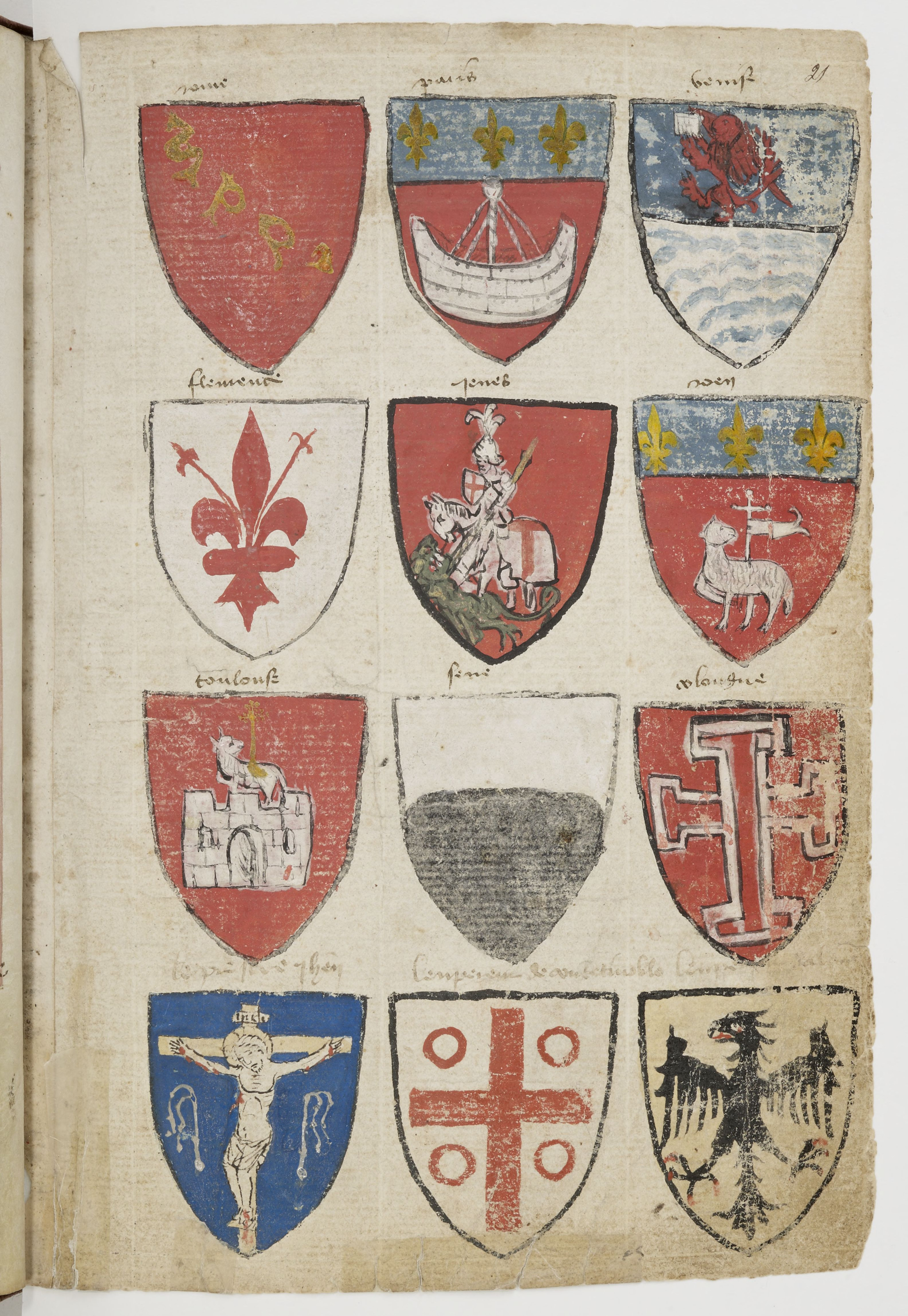
Armorial de Gilles Le Bouvier (1455), representing the sailing boat (without sails) used by the marchands de l'eau.

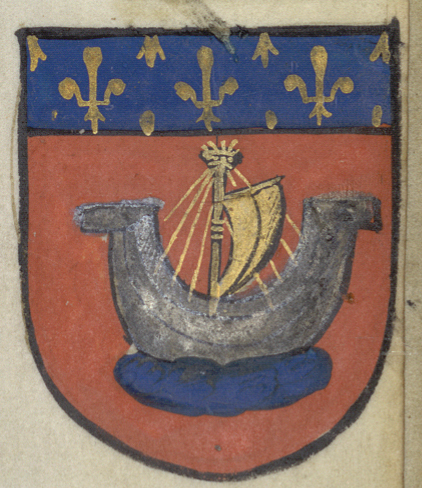
16th-century depiction showing the chief semy of fleur-de-lis

Armorial of Paris under the First Empire

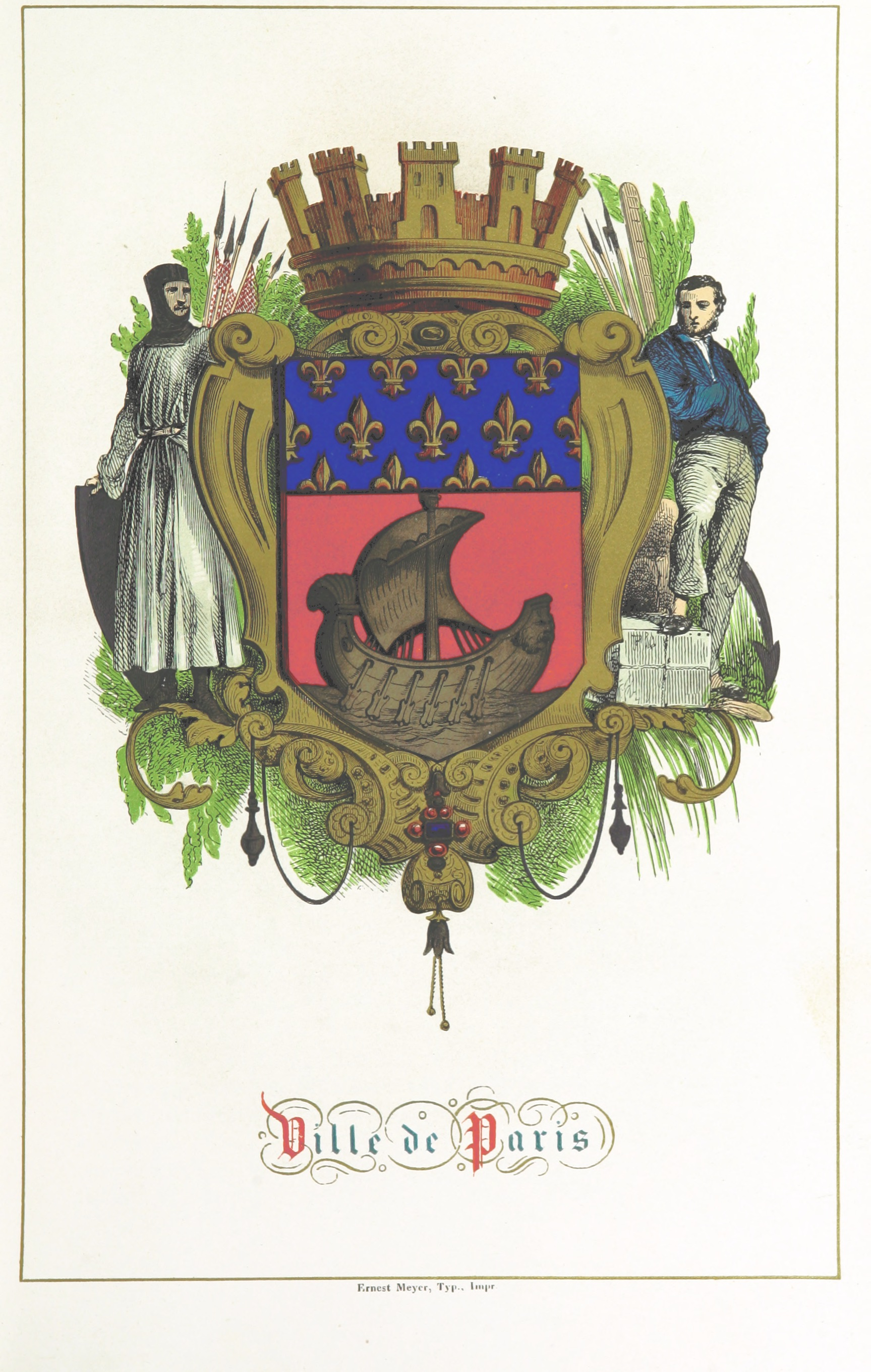
1844 depiction (July Monarchy)

Escutcheon of Paris under the Second Republic

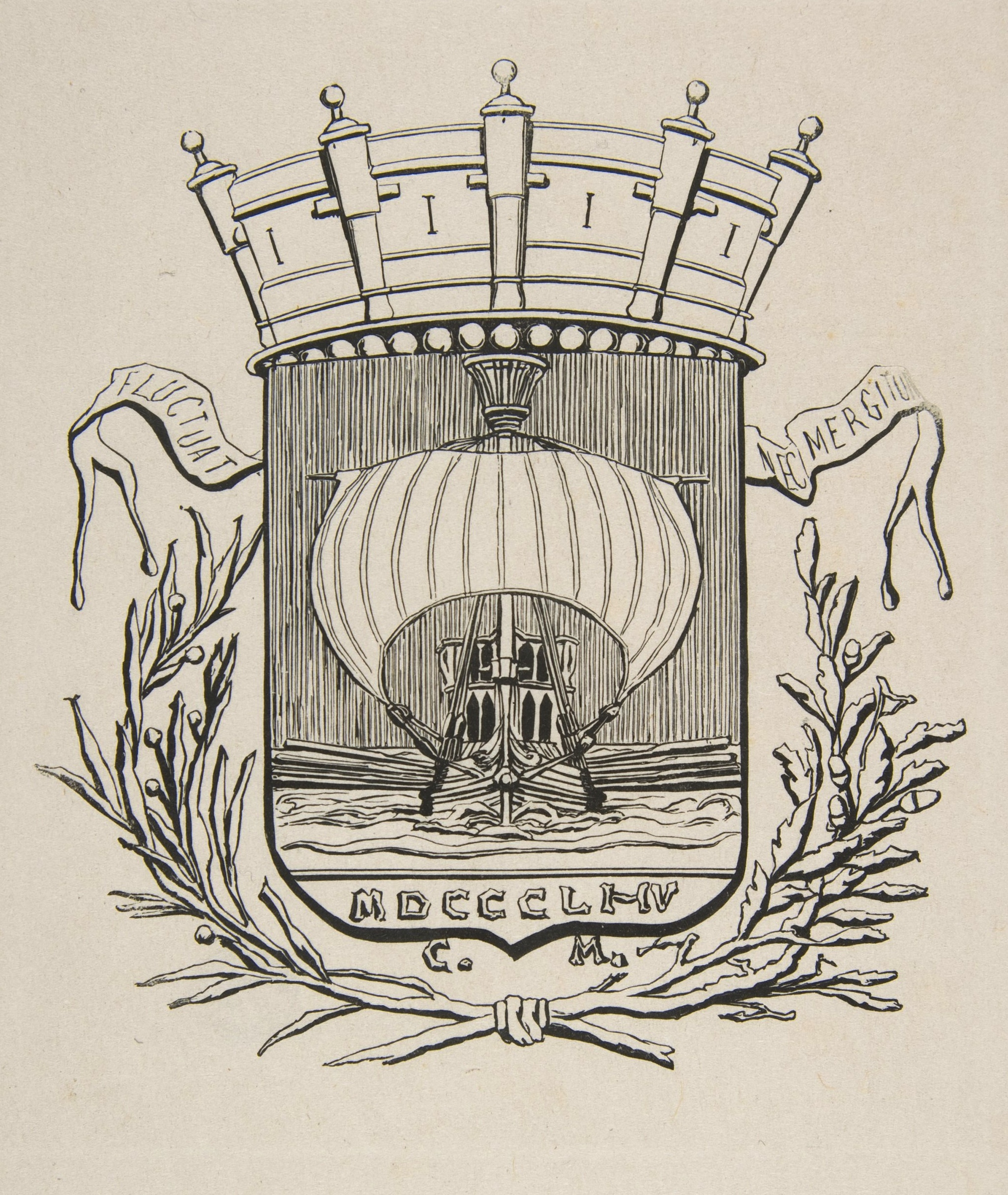
1854 depiction with the mural crown and the motto but without the chief

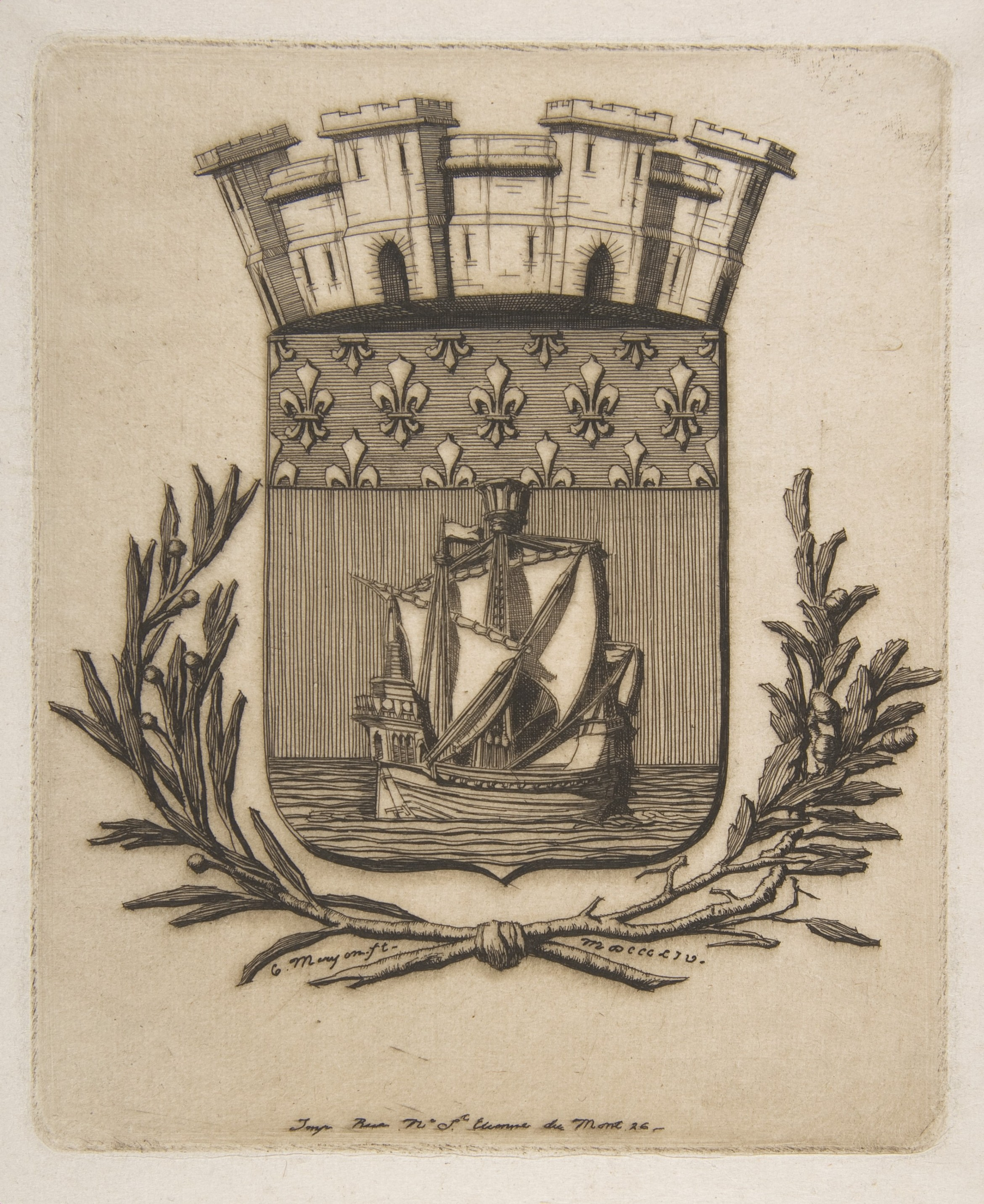
1854 depiction with the mural crown and the chief but without the motto

Coat of arms of Paris in logo of 1924 Summer Olympics

Coat of arms according to the 1942 Commission d'héraldique urbaine de la Seine (Seine's department urban heraldic commission), approved by prefectoral decree of 20 June 1942

== Motto ==
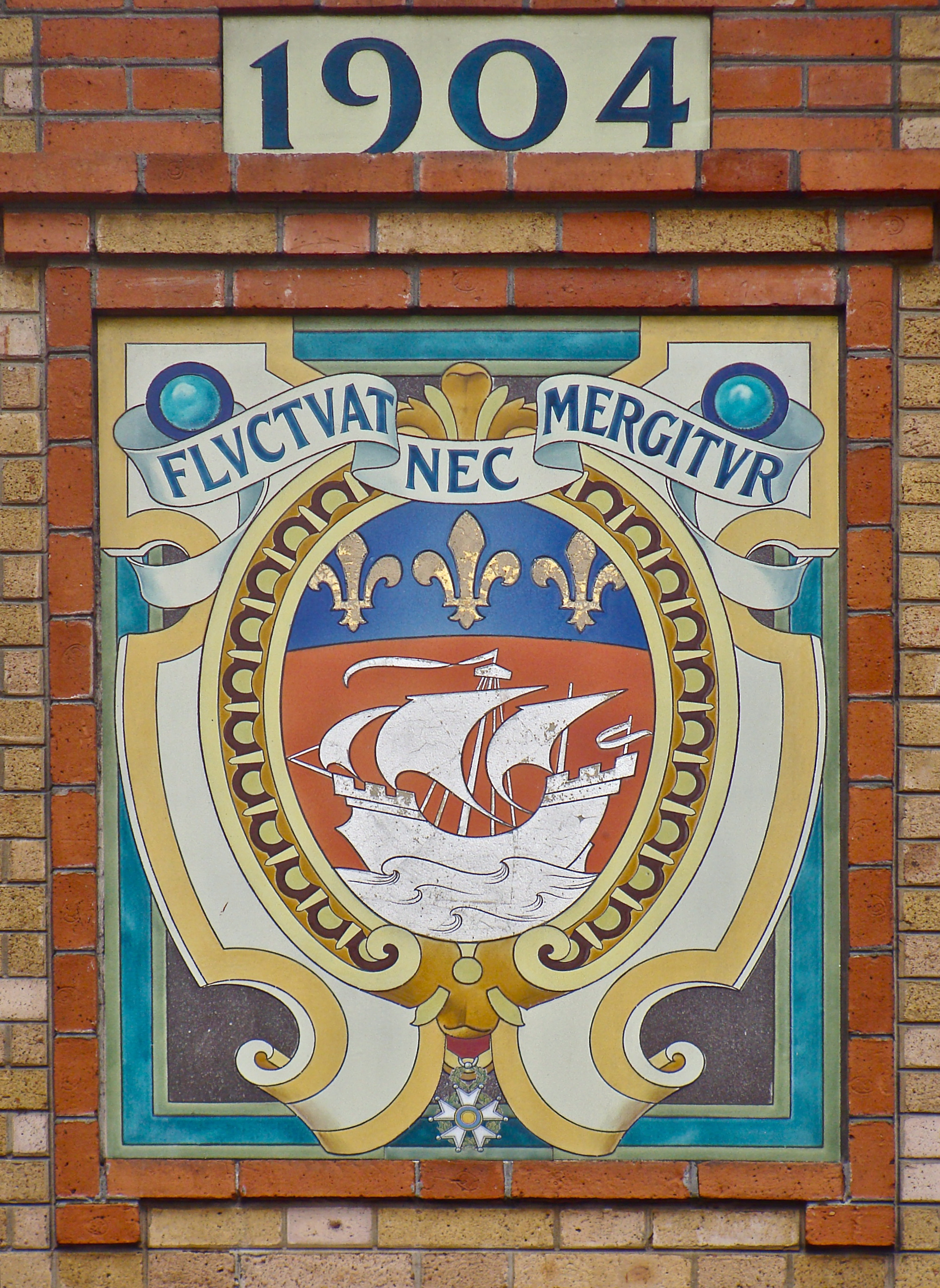
Coat of arms of Paris, 1904, on the wall of a municipal building in the 5th arrondissement of the city. The chief is styled as France moderne, with three fleur-de-lis.

Fluctuat nec mergitur ("[she] is rocked [by the waves], but does not sink"; French: Il est agité par les vagues, mais ne sombre pas or Il est battu par les flots, mais ne sombre pas) is the Latin motto of the city of Paris.

The motto originates as an abbreviation of a longer Latin distich,

Niteris incassum navem submergere Petri / Fluctuat at numquam mergitur illa ratis.
"In vain you strive to submerge the ship of Peter — this vessel rocks but is never submerged."

This verse is medieval, attributed to either Pope Gregory IX or Pope Innocent IV in the context of the war against Frederick II, in which Frederick had destroyed the Genoese fleet. The tradition of attribution to these 13th-century popes, while it may itself be spurious, has a manuscript tradition going back to at least the 15th century. The verse is mentioned in print in 1567, by Matthias Flacius.

The abbreviated verse first appears in connection with Paris, on coins (jetons), in the 1580s. Before the 19th century, it was one of the mottoes associated with Paris, neither officially, nor exclusively. It was historically also associated with the city of Aimargues.

Its official adoption as the motto of the city of Paris dates to 24 November 1853, in connection with the renovation of Paris led by Georges-Eugène Haussmann. It was included as the heraldic motto with the city's coat of arms from this time.

The motto is part of the official livery of the Paris Fire Brigade. Following the November 2015 Paris attacks, the Latin-language motto had a surge in popularity and was used in social media as a symbol of Paris' resistance in the face of terrorism.

== Contemporary use ==
The coat of arms is to be found on many Parisian public buildings, including the Hôtel de Ville, the mairies of the 20 arrondissements, the train stations, the bridges, and primary and secondary schools, and la Sorbonne. Today, the police headquarters of Paris uses a logo inspired by the coat of arms of the city of Paris. It was also represented on a postage stamp issued in 1965, the 0.30 franc "Blason de Paris". It is also used as the Garde républicaine's insignia.
