= Armorial of the House of Bonaparte =

The House of Bonaparte was a royal dynasty started by Napoleon I, son of Carlo Bonaparte. The family formed the Imperial House of France during the first French Empire. The house last ruled until 1871, when they were ultimately ousted due to the effects of the Franco-Prussian War. Here are their individual seals:

Children of Carlo Buonaparte
Figure	Name of Armiger and Blazon
	Joseph Bonaparte (1768–1844), King of Naples (1806–1808), King of Spain and the Indies (1808–1813) eldest son of Carlo Buonaparte Arms as Noble, 1768–1804 Arms as a French Prince, 1804–1806 Arms as King of Naples, 1806–1808 Arms as King of Spain and the Indies, 1808–1813
	Napoleon I (1769–1821), Emperor of the French, second son of Carlo Buonaparte Arms as Nobile, 1769-1804: Arms used in right of France, 1804-1814: Azure, an Eagle Or, head facing to the sinister, clutching in its talons a Thunderbolt Or. Arms used in right of the Kingdom of Italy, 1805-1813: Arms used in right of Elba, 1814-1815: Argent, on a bend Gules three bees Or Arms used in right of France, 1815:
	Lucien Bonaparte (1775–1846), Prince of Canino and Musignano, third son of Carlo Buonaparte
	Elisa Bonaparte (1777–1820), titular Grand Duchess of Tuscany, Princess of Lucca and Piombino, Eldest daughter of Carlo Buonaparte Arms used as Nobile, 1776–1804 Arms used as French Princess, 1804- Azure, an Eagle Or, head facing to the sinister, clutching in its talons a Thunderbolt Or.
	Louis Bonaparte, King of Holland, fourth son of Carlo Buonaparte Arms used as Noble -1804 Arms used as French Prince, 1804–1808 Arms used as King of Holland, 1808-?: Quarterly, 1 and 4, Gules, a Lion rampant Or, clutching in its dexter forepaw five arrows Or. 2 and 3, Azure, an Eagle Or, head facing to the sinister, clutching in its talons a Thunderbolt Or
	Pauline Bonaparte (1780–1825), Duchess of Guastalla, Second daughter of Carlo Buonaparte Arms used as Noble, 1780–1804 Arms used as French Princess, 1804- Azure, an Eagle Or, head facing to the sinister, clutching in its talons a Thunderbolt Or. Arms used as Duchess of Guastalla
	Jérôme Bonaparte (1784–1860), King of Westphalia, fifth son of Carlo Buonaparte Arms as a Noble, 1784–1804 Arms as a French Prince, 1804–1808 Arms in right of Westphalia, 1808–1813: Quarterly, : I, Gules, a Horse forcene Argent (for Westphalia); II, grand quarter, 1. Gules, two Lions passant Or, 2. Or, a chief Sable, charged with a mullet of six points Argent (for Ziegenhain), 3. Or, a chief Sable, charged with two mullets of six points Argent (for Nidda), 4, Or, a Lion rampant guardant Gules, armed, langued and crowned Azure (for Katzenelnbogen), on an inescutcheon en surtout, Azure, a Lion rampant barry of Argent and Gules, crowned Or (for Hesse); III gyronny of Gules and Argent of six pieces, on an inescutcheon en surtout Or a Lion Gules; IV, grand quarter, 1 Gules, two lions passant in pale Or (for Brunswick), 2 Or, a Lion rampant Gules, armed, langued and crowned Azure (for Diepholt), 3 Or, semy of hearts Gules, a Lion rampant Azure, armed and langued Gules (for Luneburg), 4 Gules, a Lion Or (for Lauterberg); en surtout, on an inescutcheon Azure, an Eagle Or, head pointing to the sinister, holding in its talons a thunderbolt Or (for Napoléon). Arms as Prince of Montfort, 1816–1850: Per pale and per fess, to the dexter, Argent, a Gonfanon Gules, to the sinister, in sinister chief, Or, a Stag's Antler Sable, and in base Or, a Lion Sable, langued and clawed Gules Arms as a Marshal of France, 1850–1860: Resumed use of the arms he had used as King of Westphalia
