= Carina in Chinese astronomy =

Constellation

The modern constellation Carina lies across one of the quadrants symbolized by the Vermillion Bird of the South (南方朱雀, Nán Fāng Zhū Què) and The Southern Asterisms (近南極星區, Jìnnánjíxīngōu), that divide the sky in traditional Chinese uranography.

According to the quadrant, possibly constellation Carina in Chinese sky is almost not seen, except Canopus (Alpha Carinae), and Canopus is "south pole" in Chinese sky, and Miaplacidus (Beta Carinae), Aspidiske (Iota Carinae) and Avior (Epsilon Carinae) are bright stars in this constellation that are possibly never seen in the Chinese sky.

The name of the western constellation in modern Chinese is 船底座 (chuán dǐ zuò), meaning "the bottom of boat constellation".

== Stars ==
The map of Chinese constellation in constellation Carina area consists of :

Four Symbols	Mansion (Chinese name)	Romanization	Translation	Asterisms (Chinese name)	Romanization	Translation	Western star name	Proper Name	Chinese star name	Romanization	Translation
Vermilion Bird of the South (南方朱雀)	井	Jǐng	Well	老人	Lǎorén	Old Man					
Vermilion Bird of the South (南方朱雀)	井	Jǐng	Well	老人	Lǎorén	Old Man	α Car	Canopus			
Vermilion Bird of the South (南方朱雀)	井	Jǐng	Well	老人	Lǎorén	Old Man	α Car	Canopus	老人	Lǎorén	(One star of)
Vermilion Bird of the South (南方朱雀)	井	Jǐng	Well	老人	Lǎorén	Old Man	α Car	Canopus	老人星	Lǎorénxīng	Star of Old Man
Vermilion Bird of the South (南方朱雀)	井	Jǐng	Well	老人	Lǎorén	Old Man	α Car	Canopus	壽星	Shòu xīng	God of longevity
Vermilion Bird of the South (南方朱雀)	井	Jǐng	Well	老人	Lǎorén	Old Man	α Car	Canopus	南極老人	Nánjílǎorén	Old man in the south pole
Vermilion Bird of the South (南方朱雀)	井	Jǐng	Well	老人	Lǎorén	Old Man	α Car	Canopus	南極	Nánjí	South pole
Vermilion Bird of the South (南方朱雀)	井	Jǐng	Well	老人	Lǎorén	Old Man	α Car	Canopus	砺石南第二星	Lìdànnándìèrxīng	2nd star in southern area of Whetsone constellation
Vermilion Bird of the South (南方朱雀)	鬼	Guǐ	Ghost	天社	Tiānshè	Celestial Earth God's Temple	χ Car		天社增一	Tiānshèzēngyī	1st additional star
-	近南極星區 (non-mansions)	Jìnnánjíxīngōu (non-mansions)	The Southern Asterisms (non-mansions)	海山	Hǎishān	Sea and Mountain					
-	近南極星區 (non-mansions)	Jìnnánjíxīngōu (non-mansions)	The Southern Asterisms (non-mansions)	海山	Hǎishān	Sea and Mountain	s Car		海山一	Hǎishānyī	1st star
-	近南極星區 (non-mansions)	Jìnnánjíxīngōu (non-mansions)	The Southern Asterisms (non-mansions)	海山	Hǎishān	Sea and Mountain	η Car				
-	近南極星區 (non-mansions)	Jìnnánjíxīngōu (non-mansions)	The Southern Asterisms (non-mansions)	海山	Hǎishān	Sea and Mountain	η Car		海山二	Hǎishānèr	2nd star
-	近南極星區 (non-mansions)	Jìnnánjíxīngōu (non-mansions)	The Southern Asterisms (non-mansions)	海山	Hǎishān	Sea and Mountain	η Car		天社	Tiānshè	Celestial altar
-	近南極星區 (non-mansions)	Jìnnánjíxīngōu (non-mansions)	The Southern Asterisms (non-mansions)	海山	Hǎishān	Sea and Mountain	u Car		海山三	Hǎishānsān	3rd star
-	近南極星區 (non-mansions)	Jìnnánjíxīngōu (non-mansions)	The Southern Asterisms (non-mansions)	海石	Hǎishí	Sea Rock					
-	近南極星區 (non-mansions)	Jìnnánjíxīngōu (non-mansions)	The Southern Asterisms (non-mansions)	海石	Hǎishí	Sea Rock	ε Car	Avior	海石一	Hǎishíyī	1st star
-	近南極星區 (non-mansions)	Jìnnánjíxīngōu (non-mansions)	The Southern Asterisms (non-mansions)	海石	Hǎishí	Sea Rock	ι Car	Aspidiske	海石二	Hǎishíèr	2nd star
-	近南極星區 (non-mansions)	Jìnnánjíxīngōu (non-mansions)	The Southern Asterisms (non-mansions)	海石	Hǎishí	Sea Rock	h Car		海石三	Hǎishísān	3rd star
-	近南極星區 (non-mansions)	Jìnnánjíxīngōu (non-mansions)	The Southern Asterisms (non-mansions)	海石	Hǎishí	Sea Rock	l Car		海石四	Hǎishísì	4th star
-	近南極星區 (non-mansions)	Jìnnánjíxīngōu (non-mansions)	The Southern Asterisms (non-mansions)	海石	Hǎishí	Sea Rock	υ Car		海石五	Hǎishíwǔ	5th star
-	近南極星區 (non-mansions)	Jìnnánjíxīngōu (non-mansions)	The Southern Asterisms (non-mansions)	海石	Hǎishí	Sea Rock	a Car		海石增一	Hǎishízēngyī	1st additional star
-	近南極星區 (non-mansions)	Jìnnánjíxīngōu (non-mansions)	The Southern Asterisms (non-mansions)	海石	Hǎishí	Sea Rock	c Car		海石增二	Hǎishízēngèr	2nd additional star
-	近南極星區 (non-mansions)	Jìnnánjíxīngōu (non-mansions)	The Southern Asterisms (non-mansions)	海石	Hǎishí	Sea Rock	i Car		海石增三	Hǎishízēngsān	3rd additional star
-	近南極星區 (non-mansions)	Jìnnánjíxīngōu (non-mansions)	The Southern Asterisms (non-mansions)	海石	Hǎishí	Sea Rock	x Car		海石增四	Hǎishízēngsì	4th additional star
-	近南極星區 (non-mansions)	Jìnnánjíxīngōu (non-mansions)	The Southern Asterisms (non-mansions)	南船	Nánchuán	Southern Boat					
-	近南極星區 (non-mansions)	Jìnnánjíxīngōu (non-mansions)	The Southern Asterisms (non-mansions)	南船	Nánchuán	Southern Boat	q Car		南船一	Nánchuányī	1st star
-	近南極星區 (non-mansions)	Jìnnánjíxīngōu (non-mansions)	The Southern Asterisms (non-mansions)	南船	Nánchuán	Southern Boat	p Car		南船二	Nánchuánèr	2nd star
-	近南極星區 (non-mansions)	Jìnnánjíxīngōu (non-mansions)	The Southern Asterisms (non-mansions)	南船	Nánchuán	Southern Boat	θ Car		南船三	Nánchuánsān	3rd star
-	近南極星區 (non-mansions)	Jìnnánjíxīngōu (non-mansions)	The Southern Asterisms (non-mansions)	南船	Nánchuán	Southern Boat	ω Car		南船四	Nánchuánsì	4th star
-	近南極星區 (non-mansions)	Jìnnánjíxīngōu (non-mansions)	The Southern Asterisms (non-mansions)	南船	Nánchuán	Southern Boat	β Car	Miaplacidus	南船五	Nánchuánwǔ	5th star
-	近南極星區 (non-mansions)	Jìnnánjíxīngōu (non-mansions)	The Southern Asterisms (non-mansions)	南船	Nánchuán	Southern Boat	I Car		南船增一	Nánchuánzēngyī	1st additional star

== See also ==
- Traditional Chinese star names
- Chinese constellations
- List of brightest stars
