= Pole star =

Visible star that is nearly aligned with Earth's axis of rotation

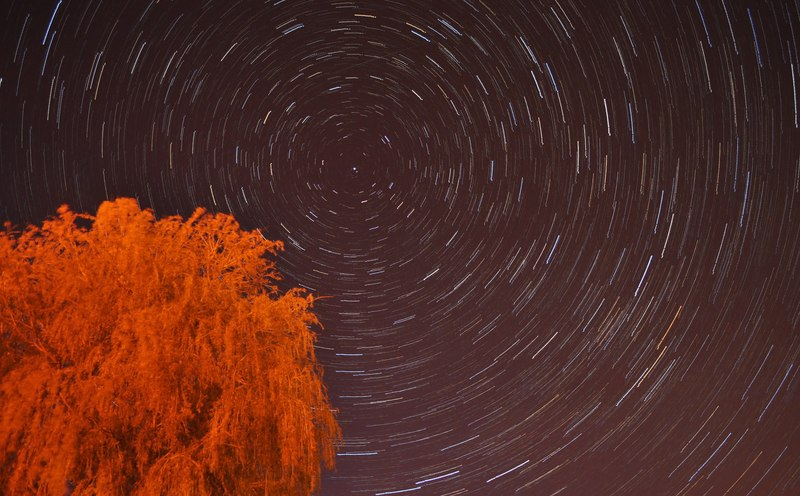
Northern Hemisphere circumpolar stars around Polaris, with a long-exposure producing a star trail photo

A pole star is a visible star that is approximately aligned with the axis of rotation of an astronomical body; that is, a star whose apparent position is close to one of the celestial poles. On Earth, a pole star would lie directly overhead when viewed from the North or the South Pole.

Currently, Earth's pole stars are Polaris (Alpha Ursae Minoris), a bright magnitude 2 star aligned approximately with its northern axis that serves as a pre-eminent star in celestial navigation, and a much dimmer magnitude 5.5 star on its southern axis, Polaris Australis (Sigma Octantis).

From around 1700 BC until just after 300 AD, Kochab (Beta Ursae Minoris) and Pherkad (Gamma Ursae Minoris) were twin northern pole stars, though neither was as close to the pole as Polaris is now.

== History ==
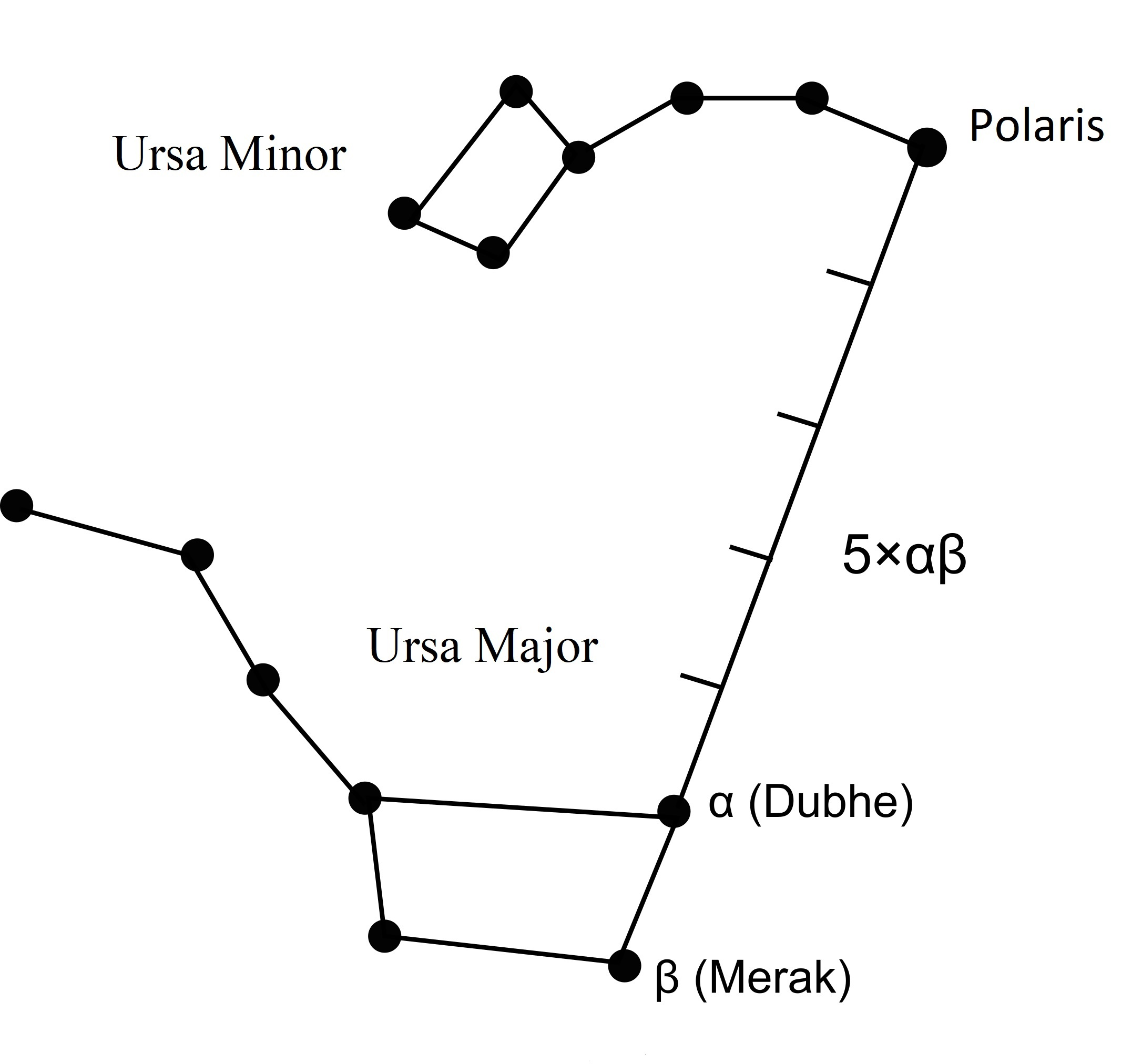
A method to find the Pole star Polaris at 5x the distance of the two front stars of the Big Dipper

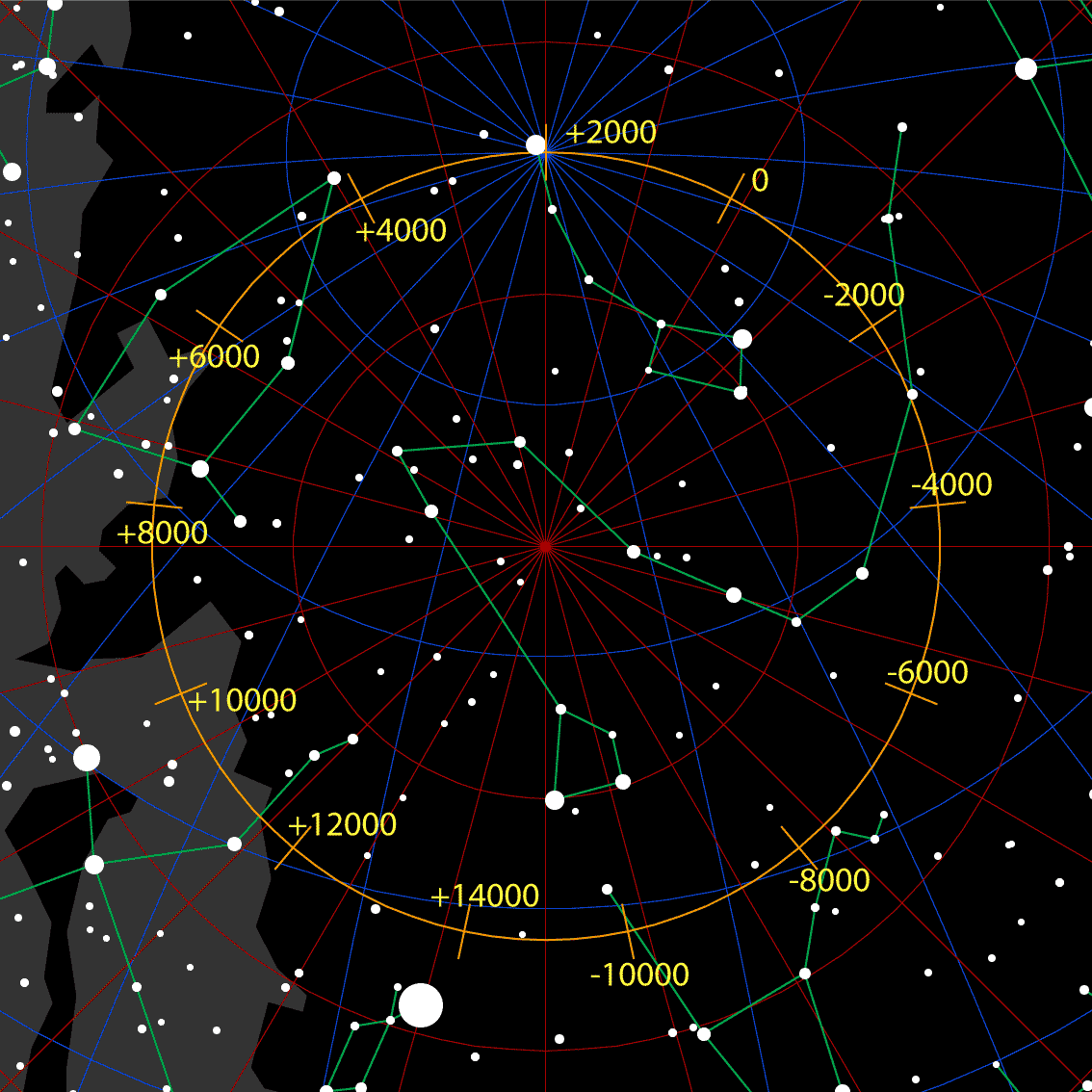
The path of the north celestial pole among the stars due to the effect of precession, with dates shown

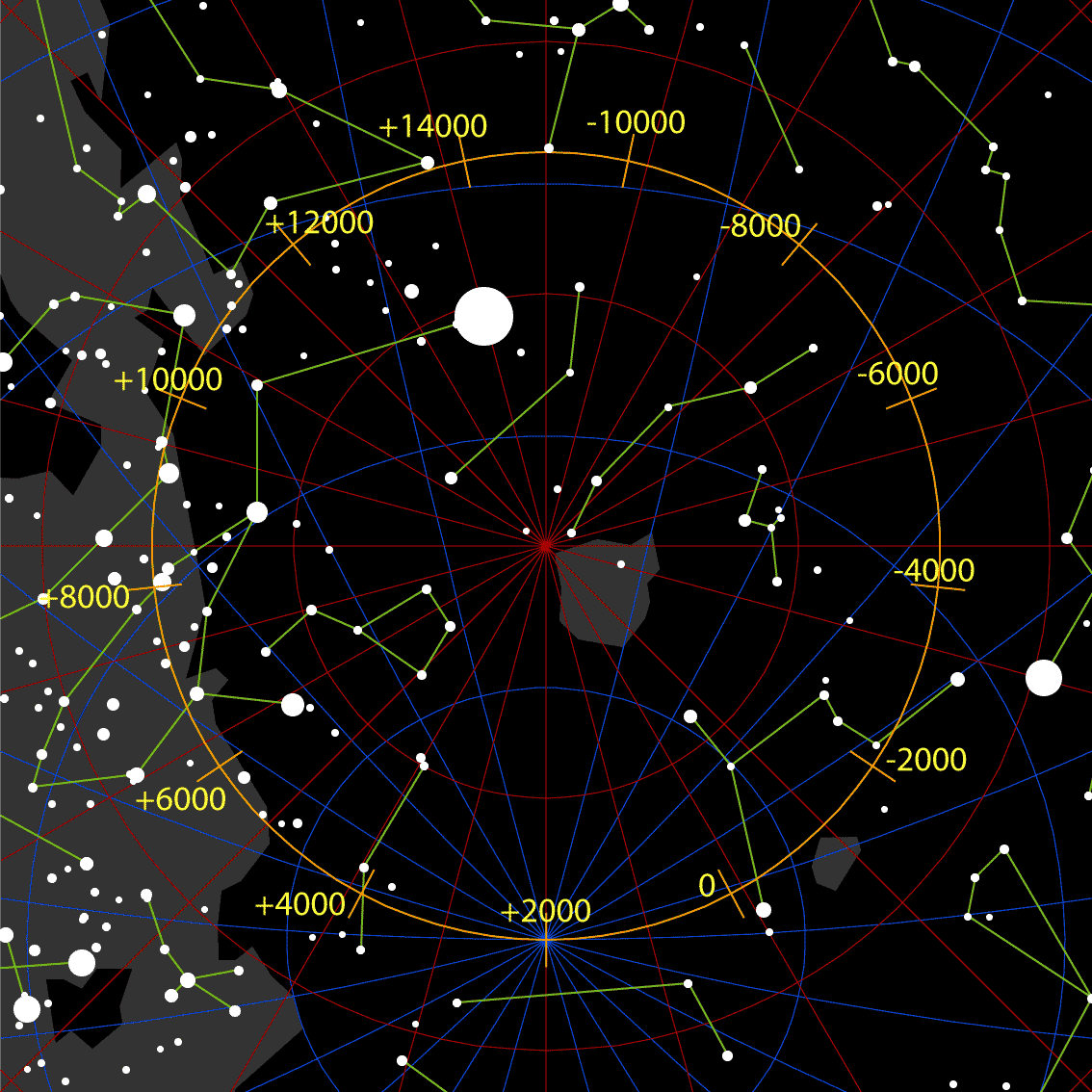
The path of the south celestial pole among the stars due to the effect of precession

In classical antiquity, Beta Ursae Minoris (Kochab) was closer to the celestial north pole than Alpha Ursae Minoris. While there was no naked-eye star close to the pole, the midpoint between Alpha and Beta Ursae Minoris was reasonably close to the pole, and it appears that the entire constellation of Ursa Minor, in antiquity known as Cynosura (Greek Κυνόσουρα "dog's tail"), was used as indicating the northern direction for the purposes of navigation by the Phoenicians. The ancient name of Ursa Minor, anglicized as cynosure, has since itself become a term for "guiding principle" after the constellation's use in navigation.

Alpha Ursae Minoris (Polaris) was described as ἀειφανής (transliterated as aeiphanes) meaning "always above the horizon", "ever-shining" by Stobaeus in the 5th century, when it was still removed from the celestial pole by about 8°. It was known as scip-steorra ("ship-star") in 10th-century Anglo-Saxon England, reflecting its use in navigation. In the Vishnu Purana, it is personified under the name Dhruva (ध्रुव, "immovable, fixed").

The name stella polaris was coined in the Renaissance, even though at that time it was well recognized that it was several degrees away from the celestial pole; Gemma Frisius in the year 1547 determined this distance as 3°8'. In his book Cosmographicus Liber of 1524 Petrus Apianus published a diagram of the north polar region ‍of the sky on which he labelled the pole star as both Stella Polaris and Stella Maris. An explicit identification of Mary as stella maris with the North Star (Polaris) becomes evident in the title Cynosura seu Mariana Stella Polaris (i.e. "Cynosure, or the Marian Polar Star"), a collection of Marian poetry published by Nicolaus Lucensis (Niccolo Barsotti de Lucca) in 1655.

== Precession of the equinoxes ==
Precession of Earth's rotational axis

In 2022 Polaris' mean declination was 89.35 degrees North; (at epoch J2000 it was 89.26 degrees N). So it appears due north in the sky to a precision better than one degree, and the angle it makes with respect to the true horizon (after correcting for refraction and other factors) is within a degree of the latitude of the observer. The celestial pole will be nearest Polaris in 2100.

Due to the precession of the equinoxes (as well as the stars' proper motions), the role of North Star has passed from one star to another in the remote past, and will pass in the remote future. In 3000 BC, the faint star Thuban in the constellation Draco was the North Star, aligning within 0.1° distance from the celestial pole, the closest of any of the visible pole stars. However, at magnitude 3.67 (fourth magnitude) it is only one-fifth as bright as Polaris, and today it is invisible in light-polluted urban skies.

During the 1st millennium BC, Beta Ursae Minoris (Kochab) was the bright star closest to the celestial pole, but it was never close enough to be taken as marking the pole, and the Greek navigator Pytheas in ca. 320 BC described the celestial pole as devoid of stars. In the Roman era, the celestial pole was about equally distant between Polaris and Kochab.

The precession of the equinoxes takes about 25,770 years to complete a cycle. Polaris' mean position (taking account of precession and proper motion) will reach a maximum declination of +89°32'23", which translates to 1657" (or 0.4603°) from the celestial north pole, in February 2102. Its maximum apparent declination (taking account of nutation and aberration) will be +89°32'50.62", which is 1629" (or 0.4526°) from the celestial north pole, on 24 March 2100.

Precession will next point the north celestial pole at stars in the northern constellation Cepheus. The pole will drift to space equidistant between Polaris and Gamma Cephei ("Errai") by 3000 AD, with Errai reaching its closest alignment with the northern celestial pole around 4200 AD. Iota Cephei and Beta Cephei will stand on either side of the northern celestial pole some time around 5200 AD, before moving to closer alignment with the brighter star Alpha Cephei ("Alderamin") around 7500 AD.

Precession will then point the north celestial pole at stars in the northern constellation Cygnus. Like Beta Ursae Minoris during the 1st millennium BC, the bright star closest to the celestial pole in the 10th millennium AD, first-magnitude Deneb, will be a distant 7° from the pole, never close enough to be taken as marking the pole, while third-magnitude Delta Cygni will be a more helpful pole star, at a distance of 3° from celestial north, around 11,250 AD. Precession will then point the north celestial pole nearer the constellation Lyra, where the second brightest star in the northern celestial hemisphere, Vega, will be a pole star around 14,500 AD, though at a distance of 5° from celestial north.

Precession will eventually point the north celestial pole nearer the stars in the constellation Hercules, pointing towards Tau Herculis around 18,400 AD. The celestial pole will then return to the stars in constellation Draco (Thuban, mentioned above) before returning to the current constellation, Ursa Minor. When Polaris becomes the North Star again around 27,800 AD, due to its proper motion it then will be farther away from the pole than it is now, while in 23,600 BC it was closer to the pole.

Over the course of Earth's 26,000-year axial precession cycle, a series of bright naked eye stars (an apparent magnitude up to +6; a full moon is −12.9) in the Northern Hemisphere will hold the transitory title of North Star. While other stars might line up with the north celestial pole during the 26,000 year cycle, they do not necessarily meet the naked eye limit needed to serve as a useful indicator of north to an Earth-based observer, resulting in periods of time during the cycle when there is no clearly defined North Star. There will also be periods during the cycle when bright stars give only an approximate guide to "north", as they may be greater than 5° of angular diameter removed from direct alignment with the north celestial pole.

The 26,000 year cycle of North Stars, starting with the current star, with stars that will be "near-north" indicators when no North Star exists during the cycle, including each star's average brightness and closest alignment to the north celestial pole during the cycle:

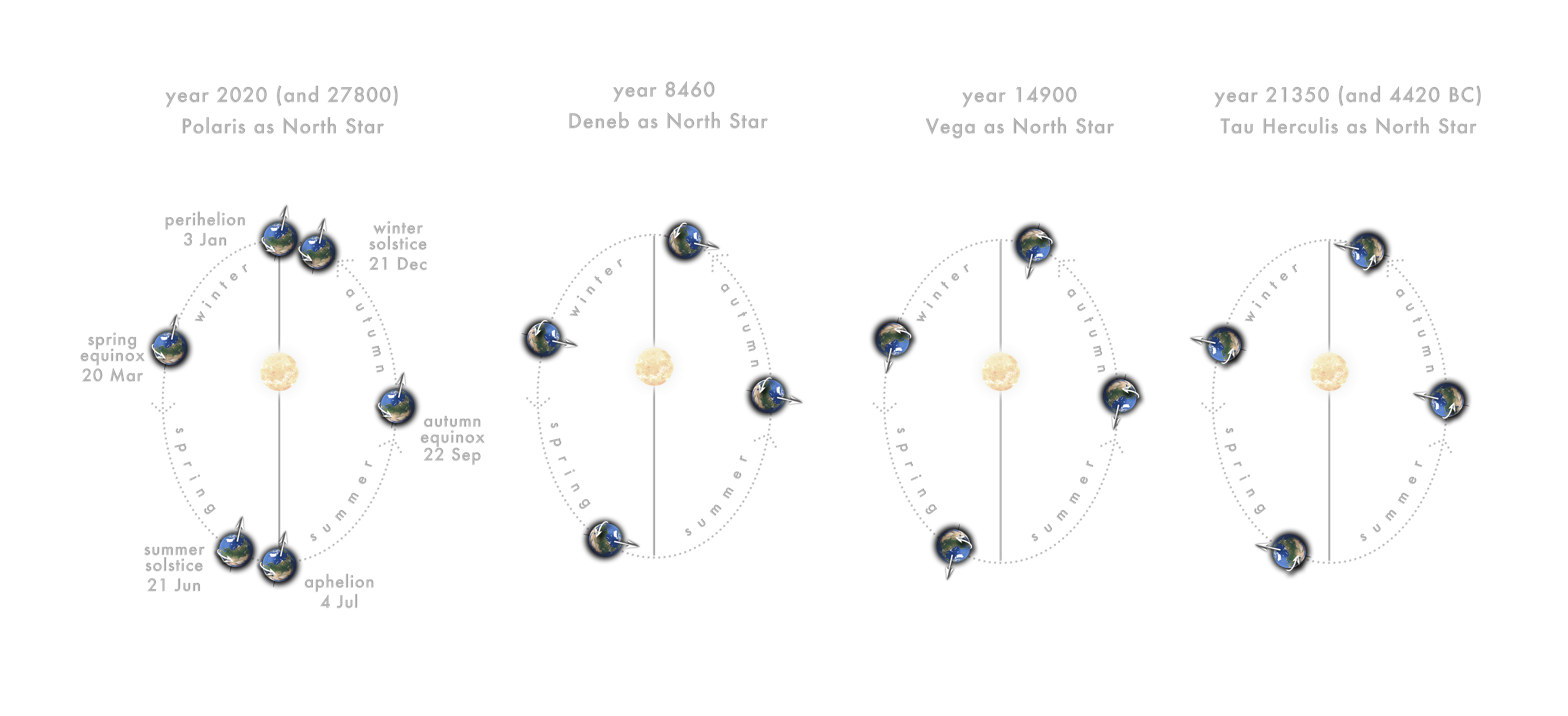
Axial and apsidal precession with four of the nearest northern pole stars over the course of millennia

Bayer	Tradi- tional	V	Constel- lation	Align- ment	notes
Alpha Ursae Minoris	Polaris	1.98	Ursa Minor	within 0.5°	the current North Star
Gamma Cephei	Errai	3.21	Cepheus	within 3°	will become the North Star at about 3,100 AD
Beta Cephei	Alfirk	3.51	Cepheus	within 5°	will become the North Star at about 5,900 AD
Iota Cephei		3.51	Cepheus	within 5°	shares timing with Beta Cephei
Alpha Cephei	Alderamin	2.51	Cepheus	within 3°	will become the North Star at about 7,500 AD
Alpha Cygni	Deneb	1.25	Cygnus	within 7°	will become the North Star at about 9,800 AD
Delta Cygni	Fawaris	2.87	Cygnus	within 3°	will become the North Star at about 11,250 AD
Alpha Lyrae	Vega	0.026	Lyra	within 5°	used to be the North Star at about 12,000 BC; and will become the North Star at 14,500 AD
Iota Herculis	Tianbang	3.75	Hercules	within 4°	used to be the North Star at about 10,000 BC; and will become the North Star at 16,000 AD
Tau Herculis	Asuusiha	3.89	Hercules	within 1°	used to be the North Star at about 7,400 BC; and will become the North Star at 18,400 AD
Iota Draconis	Edasich	3.29	Draco	within 5°	used to be the North Star at about 4,420 BC
Alpha Draconis	Thuban	3.65	Draco	within 0.1°	used to be the North Star at about 2,800 BC
Beta Ursae Minoris	Kochab	2.08	Ursa Minor	within 7°	used to be the North Star at about 1,100 BC
Kappa Draconis		3.82	Draco	within 6°	a near-north star, shares timing with Kochab

== Southern pole star (South Star) ==
Series of shots showing the rotation of the Earth's axis relative to the south celestial pole. The Magellanic Clouds, Coalsack Nebula, and Southern Cross (next to the Coalsack) are clearly visible. Near the end of the video, the rise of the Moon illuminates the scene. (Argentina, 2014)

Currently, there is no South Pole Star like Polaris, the so-called North Star. Sigma Octantis is the closest near naked-eye star to the south celestial pole, but at apparent magnitude 5.47 it is barely visible on a clear night, making it less useful for casual navigational or astronomy alignment purposes. It is a yellow giant 294 light years from Earth. Its angular separation from the pole is about 1° (as of 2000). The Southern Cross constellation functions as an approximate southern pole constellation, by pointing to where a southern pole star would be.

At the equator, it is possible to see both Polaris and the Southern Cross. The celestial south pole is moving toward the Southern Cross, which has pointed to the south pole for the last 2000 years or so. As a consequence, the constellation is no longer visible from subtropical northern latitudes, as it was in the time of the ancient Greeks.

Around 200 BC, the star Beta Hydri was the nearest bright star to the celestial south pole. Around 2800 BC, Achernar was only 8 degrees from the south pole.

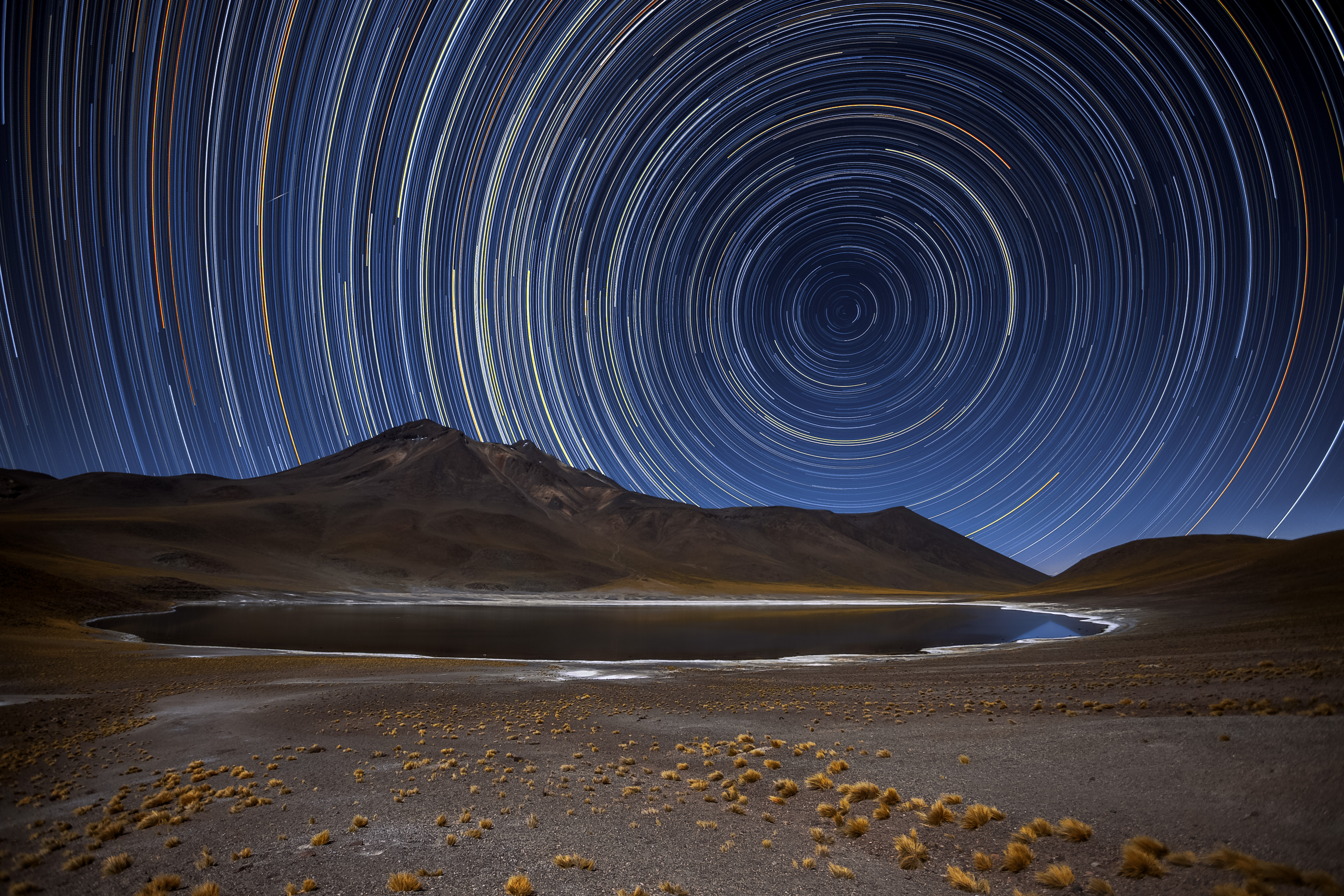
Circle of southern stars, Chile, 2016

In the next 7500 years, the south celestial pole will pass close to the stars Gamma Chamaeleontis (4200 AD), I Carinae, Omega Carinae (5800 AD), Upsilon Carinae, Iota Carinae (Aspidiske, 8100 AD) and Delta Velorum (Alsephina, 9200 AD). From the eightieth to the ninetieth centuries, the south celestial pole will travel through the False Cross. Around 14,000 AD Canopus will have a declination of –82°, meaning it will rise and set daily for latitudes between 8°S and 8°N, and will not rise to viewers north of this latter 8th parallel north.

Precession and proper motion mean that Sirius will be a future southern pole star: at 88.4° S declination in the year 66,270 AD; and 87.7° S declination in the year 93,830 AD.

Bayer	Other name	V	Constel- lation	Align- ment	notes
Sigma Octantis	Polaris Australis	5.47	Octans	1°	The current South Star
Beta Hydri	-	2.80	Hydrus		used to be the South Star at about 200 BC
Gamma Chamaeleontis	-	4.12	Chamaeleon	2°	Will be the South Star in 4,200 AD
Omega Carinae	-	3.29	Carina		Will be the South Star in 5,800 AD
I Carinae	HR 4102	3.99	Carina		Will share timing with Omega Carinae
Iota Carinae	Aspidiske	2.21	Carina		Will be the South Star in 8,100 AD
Upsilon Carinae	-	2.97	Carina		Will share timing with Iota Carinae
Delta Velorum	Alsephina	1.95 - 2.43	Vela		Will be the South Star in 9,200 AD
Alpha Carinae	Canopus	−0.74	Carina	10°	Used to be the South Star at about 12,000 BC and will become the South Star at 14,000 AD
Alpha Eridani	Achernar	0.40–0.46	Eridanus		Used to be the South Star at about 2,800 BC and will become the South Star at 22,000 AD
Alpha Canis Majoris	Sirius	−1.46	Canis Major		Will be the South Star in 66,270 AD

== Other planets ==
Pole stars of other planets are defined analogously: they are stars (brighter than 6th magnitude, i.e., visible to the naked eye under ideal conditions) that most closely coincide with the projection of the planet's axis of rotation onto the celestial sphere. Different planets have different pole stars because their axes are oriented differently. (See Poles of astronomical bodies.)

Planet	North star	South star	notes
Mercury	Omicron Draconis	Alpha Pictoris	
Venus	Eta^{1} Doradus	42 Draconis	The IAU uses the right-hand rule to define a positive pole for the purpose of determining orientation. Using this convention, Venus is tilted 177° ("upside down").
Moon	Omicron Draconis	Delta Doradus	Due to axial precession, the lunar pole describes a small circle on the celestial sphere every 18.6 years. e.g. Moore, Patrick (1983), The Guinness Book of Astronomy Facts & Feats, p. 29, "In 1968 the north pole star of the Moon was Omega Draconis; by 1977 it was 36 Draconis. The south pole star is Delta Doradus."
Mars	The top two stars in the Northern Cross, Gamma Cygni and Deneb, point to the pole.	Kappa Velorum is a couple of degrees away.	
Jupiter	a little over two degrees away from Zeta Draconis	about two degrees north of Delta Doradus	
Saturn	in the far northern region of Cepheus, about six degrees from Polaris	Delta Octantis	
Uranus	Eta Ophiuchi	15 Orionis	
Neptune	midway between Gamma Cygni and Delta Cygni	Gamma Velorum	

== In religion and mythology ==
The North Star pictured in the coat of arms of Utsjoki

In the medieval period, Polaris was also known as stella maris ("star of the sea", from its use for navigation at sea), as in e.g. Bartholomaeus Anglicus (d. 1272), in the translation of John Trevisa (1397):

by the place of this sterre place and stedes and boundes of the other sterres and of cercles of heven ben knowen: therefore astronomers beholde mooste this sterre. Then this ster is dyscryved of the moste shorte cercle; for he is ferre from the place that we ben in; he hydeth the hugenesse of his quantite for unmevablenes of his place, and he doth cerfifie men moste certenly, that beholde and take hede therof; and therfore he is called stella maris, the sterre of the see, for he ledeth in the see men that saylle and have shyppemannes crafte.

Polaris was associated with Marian veneration from an early time, Our Lady, Star of the Sea being a title of the Blessed Virgin. This tradition goes back to a misreading of Saint Jerome's translation of Eusebius' Onomasticon, De nominibus hebraicis (written ca. 390). Jerome gave stilla maris "drop of the sea" as a (false) Hebrew etymology of the name Maria. This stilla maris was later misread as stella maris; the misreading is also found in the manuscript tradition of Isidore's Etymologiae (7th century); it probably arises in the Carolingian era; a late 9th-century manuscript of Jerome's text still has stilla, not stella, but Paschasius Radbertus, also writing in the 9th century, makes an explicit reference to the "Star of the Sea" metaphor, saying that Mary is the "Star of the Sea" to be followed on the way to Christ, "lest we capsize amid the storm-tossed waves of the sea."

In Mandaean cosmology, the Pole Star is considered to be auspicious and is associated with the World of Light ("heaven"). Mandaeans face north when praying, and temples are also oriented towards the north. On the contrary, the south is associated with the World of Darkness.

In Hinduism, the Pole Star is revered and referred to as Dhruva (Sanskrit: ध्रुव, IAST: Dhruva, lit. "unshakeable, immovable, fixed or eternal"). Dhruva is considered an ascetic devotee of Vishnu mentioned in the Vishnu Purana (Sanskrit: विष्णुपुराण) and the Bhagavata Purana (Sanskrit: भागवतपुराण) who ascended to become the Polestar. The Sanskrit term dhruva nakshatra (ध्रुव नक्षत्र, "polar star") has been used for Pole Star in the Mahabharata (Sanskrit: महाभारतम्), personified as son of Uttānapāda and grandson of Manu (Sanskrit: मनु).

== See also ==
- Astronomy on Mars § Celestial poles and ecliptic
- Celestial equator
- Direction determination
- Empirical evidence for the spherical shape of Earth § Observation of certain, fixed stars from different locations
- Guide star
- Lists of stars
- Worship of heavenly bodies
