= Avior =

Avior may refer to:

- Avior Airlines - an airline based in Barcelona, Anzoátegui, Venezuela
- Epsilon Carinae, a Binary star system located in the constellation Carina, with the primary component having the proper name Avior.
