= Hertzsprung gap =

Feature of the Hertzsprung-Russell diagram

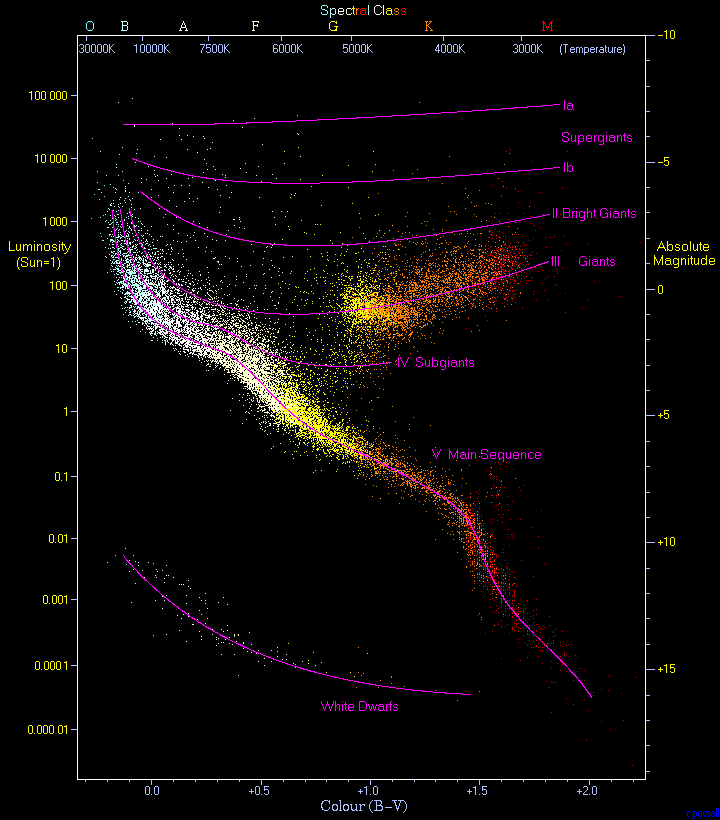
Hertzsprung–Russell diagram with the Hertzsprung Gap visible as an area containing few stars between the main sequence and red-giant branch.

The Hertzsprung gap is a feature of the Hertzsprung–Russell diagram for a star cluster, notable for the relative absence of stars compared to nearby regions to the gap. The gap is named after Ejnar Hertzsprung, who first noticed a gap in the Hertzsprung–Russell diagram between A5 and G0 spectral type and between +1 and −3 absolute magnitudes. This gap lies between the top of the main sequence and the base of red giants for stars above roughly 1.5 solar mass. When a star during its evolution crosses the Hertzsprung gap, it means that it has finished core hydrogen burning. Conversely, a star may re-enter the Hertzsprung gap after crossing it in a blue loop event. The location is roughly triangular, though ill-defined at the edges.

Stars do exist in the Hertzsprung gap region, but because they move through this section of the Hertzsprung–Russell diagram very quickly in comparison to the lifetime of the star (thousands of years, compared to millions or billions of years for the lifetime of the star), that portion of the diagram is less densely populated. Full Hertzsprung–Russell diagrams of the 11,000 Hipparcos mission targets show a handful of stars in that region.

Well-known stars inside of or towards the end of the Hertzsprung gap include:

- Epsilon Pegasi
- Pi Puppis
- Epsilon Geminorum
- Beta Arae
- Gamma Cygni
- Capella B

Canopus, Iota Carinae, and Upsilon Carinae are also starting to enter the gap.

== See also ==
- Subgiant
