= I Carinae =

The Bayer designations i Carinae and I Carinae are distinct (lower and upper case i) and refer to stars/star systems of apparent magnitude 3.96 and 3.99 respectively.

- for i Carinae, see HD 79447
- for I Carinae, see HR 4102

== See also ==
- ι Carinae (Iota Carinae)
