= USS Carina =

Cargo ship of the United States Navy

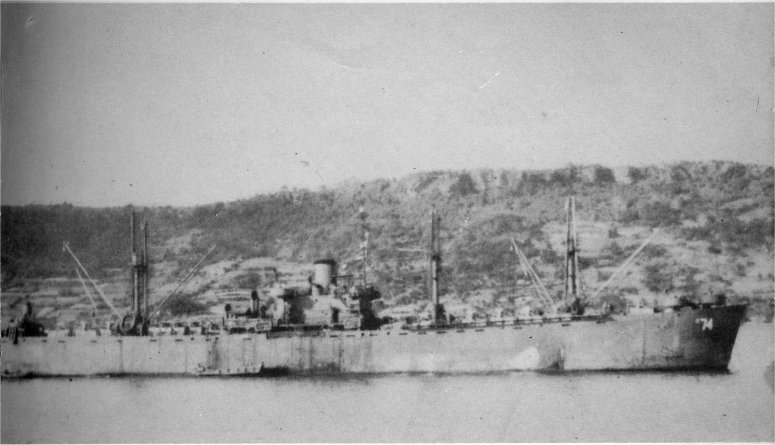
- USS Carina (AK-74), anchored after a Japanese suicide boat attack at Okinawa, 4 May 1945.

History

United States
- Name: David Davis; Carina
- Namesake: David Davis; The constellation Carina
- Ordered: as a Type EC2-S-C1 hull, MCE hull 502
- Builder: Permanente Metals Corporation, Richmond, California
- Cost: $1,174,563
- Yard number: 502
- Way number: 7
- Laid down: 30 September 1942
- Launched: 6 November 1942
- Sponsored by: Mrs. A. R. Olds
- Acquired: 20 November 1942
- Commissioned: 1 December 1942
- Decommissioned: 16 October 1945
- Stricken: 1 November 1945
- Identification: Hull symbol: AK-74; Code letters: NYJY
- Honours and awards: 3 × battle stars
- Fate: Sold for scrapping, 1 February 1952, scrapping completed, 20 March 1953

General characteristics
- Class & type: Crater-class cargo ship
- Type: Type EC2-S-C1
- Displacement: 4,023 long tons (4,088 t) (standard); 14,550 long tons (14,780 t) (full load)
- Length: 441 ft 6 in (134.57 m)
- Beam: 56 ft 11 in (17.35 m)
- Draft: 28 ft 4 in (8.64 m)
- Installed power: 2 × Oil fired 450 °F (232 °C) boilers, operating at 220 psi (1,500 kPa) , (manufactured by Babcock & Wilcox); 2,500 shp (1,900 kW)
- Propulsion: 1 × Vertical triple-expansion reciprocating steam engine, (manufactured by Hooven-Owens-Rentschler); 1 × screw propeller
- Speed: 12.5 kn (23.2 km/h; 14.4 mph)
- Capacity: 7,800 t (7,700 long tons) DWT; 444,206 cu ft (12,578.5 m^{3}) (non-refrigerated)
- Complement: 195
- Armament: 1 × 5 in (130 mm)/38-caliber dual-purpose gun; 1 × 3 in (76 mm)/50-caliber dual-purpose gun; 2 × 40 mm (1.6 in) 40mm Bofors anti-aircraft gun mounts; 6 × 20 mm (0.79 in) Oerlikon cannons anti-aircraft gun mounts

USS Carina (AK-74) was a Crater-class cargo ship, and the only ship of the US Navy to have this name. She was named for the southern constellation Carina, with most of her sister ships being named for constellations or stars.

== Construction ==
Carina was laid down 30 September 1942, as the liberty ship SS David Davis under a Maritime Commission (MARCOM) contract, MC hull 502, launched on 6 November 1942, by Permanente Metals Corporation, Yard No. 1, Richmond, California. She was sponsored by Mrs. A. R. Olds; transferred to the Navy on 20 November 1942, and commissioned on 1 December 1942.

== Service history ==
Carina departed from San Francisco Bay on 14 December 1942, laden with cargo for Espiritu Santo and Guadalcanal in the South Pacific Ocean. At Guadalcanal, she unloaded her cargo between 23 January and 4 February 1943, bringing support to the last phases of the campaign for that island. Operating to aid in the consolidation of the southern Solomon Islands, she steamed between the main port of Espiritu Santo and Purvis Bay, Tulagi, Tongatapu, and Tagoma Point. On 3 March, while she was unloading at Tulagi, she endured two air attacks. Several near misses with bombs occurred, spraying her with shrapnel and wounding six of her crewmen.

After repairs at Espiritu Santo, Carina resumed her cargo runs until May 1943, when she steamed to Australia, arriving on 30 May for engine repairs and to replenish at the ports of Townsville, Sydney, and Melbourne. She next carried cargo for US Marine Corps units that were training in New Zealand, arriving at the port of Auckland in August. Next, she returned to her supply runs closer to the combat zone in the South Pacific. She added the Fiji Islands, the Russell Islands, New Guinea, the Admiralty Islands and Norfolk Island to her list of Pacific Island delivery ports. Carina continued her cargo missions until 12 July 1943, when she departed from Espiritu Santo and steamed home for an overhaul and crewmen's leave at San Francisco, California.

=== Philippines ===
This shipyard overhaul prepared Carina for service with distant voyages in support of the Liberation of the Philippines. Among other tasks, she carried pontoons from Pearl Harbor to Ulithi Atoll between 2 October 1944 and 31 December 1944. Returning to San Francisco for further repairs and upgrades, she went towards the combat areas again on 9 March 1945.

=== Okinawa ===
She arrived in the dangerous combat waters off Okinawa on 26 April, and on 4 May, she became the target of a determined Japanese suicide boat, which successfully rammed Carina. The impact produced a violent explosion on her port side, knocked out one of her boilers, and flooded one of her holds. Six crewmen were injured by the explosion. Skillful damage control saved both Carina and her cargo, and she was able to complete the unloading of her cargo at Okinawa before departing for temporary repairs at the Navy base at Ulithi Atoll. Carina returned to the West Coast of the United States for an overhaul in July, and the war ended in August before she saw service again. On 17 October 1945, she was decommissioned at Suisun Bay, California, and was delivered to the War Shipping Administration for long-term storage.

== Disposition ==
Carina was sold to National Metal and Steel Corporation, for $171,711.17 on 1 February 1952, for scrapping. She was removed from the Suisun Bay Reserve Fleet, Suisun Bay, California, 7 April 1952. Her scrapping was completed 20 March 1953.

== Awards ==
Carina received three battle stars for her World War II service.

== Bibliography ==
- "Carina". Dictionary of American Naval Fighting Ships. Naval History and Heritage Command. This article incorporates text from this source, which is in the public domain.
- "Kaiser Permanente No. 1, Richmond CA". www.ShipbuildingHistory.com. 13 October 2010.
- "USS Carina (AK-74)". NavSource. 4 April 2014.
- "Carina". United States Department of Transportation. Archived from the original on December 12, 2019.
- "David Davis". United States Department of Transportation. Archived from the original on December 12, 2019.
- "SS David Davis".
