= Epsilon Carinae =

Binary star in the constellation Carina

ε Carinae
- Location of ε Carinae (circled in red)

Observation data Epoch J2000 Equinox ICRS
- Constellation: Carina
- Right ascension: 08^{h} 22^{m} 30.83526^{s}
- Declination: −59° 30′ 34.1431″
- Apparent magnitude (V): 1.86 (2.01 + 3.85)

Characteristics
- Spectral type: K3 III + B2 Vp
- U−B color index: +0.19
- B−V color index: +1.27
- Variable type: Eclipsing (suspected); LPV (A); SBP or α^{2} CVn (B)

Astrometry
Radial velocity (R_{v})	+11.6 km/s
Proper motion (μ)	RA: −25.52 mas/yr Dec.: 22.72 mas/yr
Parallax (π)	5.39±0.42 mas
Distance	610 ± 50 ly (190 ± 10 pc)
Absolute magnitude (M_{V})	−4.47 (−4.3, −1.8, −1.7)

Details

ε Car A
Mass	10.5 M_{☉}
Radius	151 ± 14 (Note: Applying the Stefan–Boltzmann law with a nominal solar effective temperature of 5,772 K: $$\sqrt{\biggl(\frac{5,772}{4,460}\biggr)^4 \cdot 10^{3.91}} = 151\ R_\odot$$.) R_{☉}
Luminosity	8,128 L_{☉}
Temperature	4,460±90 K
Age	31.2±10.1 Myr

ε Car B
Mass	7.30 M_{☉}
Temperature	20,417 K
Age	20 Myr

Other designations
- Avior, CD−59°1032, FK5 315, HIP 41037, HR 3307, SAO 235932
- A: HD 71129
- B: HD 71130

Database references
SIMBAD	ε Carinae
- A
- B

Epsilon Carinae is a binary star in the southern constellation of Carina. It has the official proper name Avior, pronounced /ˈeɪvjər/; Epsilon Carinae is its Bayer designation. At apparent magnitude +1.86 it is one of the brightest stars in the night sky, but is not visible from most of the Northern Hemisphere. The False Cross is an asterism formed of Delta Velorum, Kappa Velorum, Iota Carinae and ε Carinae. It is so called because it is sometimes mistaken for the Southern Cross, causing errors in astronavigation.

== Characteristics ==
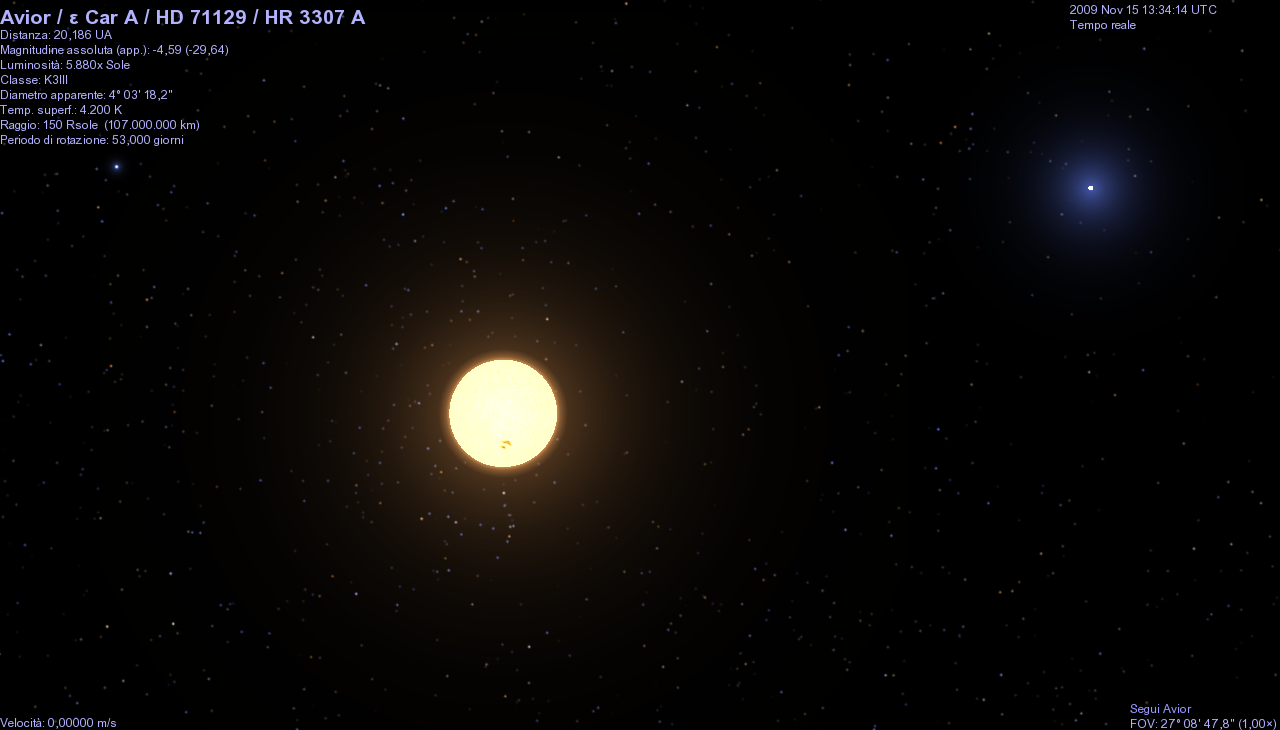
Celestia simulation of the ε Carinae system

Epsilon Carinae is located roughly 610 light-years (190 parsecs) from the Sun. Measurements during the Hipparcos mission give the pair an angular separation of 0.46 arcseconds with a difference in magnitude of 2.0. At their estimated distance, this angle is equivalent to a physical separation of 87 astronomical units. (Note: 0.46" • 190 pc = 87.4 au.)

The primary component is a has an apparent visual magnitude of 2.01, which by itself would still make it the third-brightest star in the constellation. It is an evolved giant star with a stellar classification of K3 III. However, examination of the ultraviolet flux from this star suggests it may instead be of spectral type K7. The star is a long-period variable, as deduced from the photometric variability and classification as a red giant star.

The fainter secondary companion has an apparent visual magnitude of 3.85, which, if it were a solitary star, would be bright enough to be seen with the naked eye. This is a hot, core hydrogen-fusing B-type main sequence star of spectral class B2 Vp. The secondary may itself have an orbiting stellar companion of spectral class F8. This pair may form an eclipsing binary system with a period of 785 days (2.15 years), resulting in a magnitude change of 0.12 during each eclipse. Photometric observations show variations consistent with component B being a slowly pulsating B-type star, but since the 'p' in the spectral type indicates chemical peculiarity, it may be instead an α^{2} Canum Venaticorum variable.

== Etymology ==
ε Carinae, which is Latinised to Epsilon Carinae, is the star's Bayer designation, and is abbreviated Epsilon Car or ε Car.

The name Avior is not classical in origin. It was assigned to the star by HM Nautical Almanac Office in the late 1930s during the creation of The Air Almanac, a navigational almanac for the Royal Air Force. Of the fifty-seven navigation stars included in the new almanac, two had no classical names: Epsilon Carinae and Alpha Pavonis. The RAF insisted that all of the stars must have names, so new names were invented. Alpha Pavonis was named "Peacock", a translation of Pavo, whilst Epsilon Carinae was called "Avior". Donald Sadler, then Superintendent of HM Nautical Almanac Office, recounted this in his memoirs but failed to explain the etymology of the invented name. In 2016, the International Astronomical Union organized a Working Group on Star Names (WGSN) to catalog and standardize proper names for stars. The WGSN's first bulletin of July 2016 included a table of the first two batches of names approved by the WGSN; which included Avior for Epsilon Carinae A.

In Chinese, 海石 (Hǎi Shí), meaning Sea Rock, refers to an asterism consisting of ε Carinae, Iota Carinae, HD 83183, HD 84810 and Upsilon Carinae. Consequently, ε Carinae itself is known as 海石一 (Hǎi Shí yī, English: the First Star of Sea Rock.)
