= HD 90853 =

Star in the southern constellation Carina

- Location of s Carinae (circled in red)

Observation data Epoch J2000.0 Equinox J2000.0
- Constellation: Carina
- Right ascension: 10^{h} 27^{m} 52.72877^{s}
- Declination: −58° 44′ 21.8507″
- Apparent magnitude (V): 3.81

Characteristics
- Spectral type: F2II or F0Ib
- B−V color index: 0.317±0.019

Astrometry
Radial velocity (R_{v})	+9.4±0.7 km/s
Proper motion (μ)	RA: −14.47 mas/yr Dec.: +2.36 mas/yr
Parallax (π)	2.43±0.12 mas
Distance	1,340 ± 70 ly (410 ± 20 pc)
Absolute magnitude (M_{V})	−4.44

Details
Mass	7.00±0.55 M_{☉}
Radius	45.05+3.74 −4.03 R_{☉}
Luminosity	3,466±392 L_{☉}
Surface gravity (log g)	1.50 cgs
Temperature	6,598+317 −258 K
Metallicity [Fe/H]	−0.37 dex
Rotational velocity (v sin i)	22.0 km/s
Age	100 Myr

Other designations
- s Car, NSV 4869, AAVSO 1024-58C, CPD−58°2227, FK5 393, GC 14388, HD 90853, HIP 51232, HR 4114, SAO 238085

Database references
SIMBAD	data

HD 90853 is a single star in the southern constellation Carina. It has the Bayer designation s Carinae, while HD 90853 is the identifier from the Henry Draper catalogue. This is a suspected variable star with an apparent visual magnitude reported to vary between 3.79 and 3.83, and thus is bright enough to be visible to the naked eye. It is located at a distance of approximately 1,340 light-years from the Sun based on parallax, and has an absolute magnitude of −4.44. The star is drifting further away with a radial velocity of +9 km/s.

This is an aging bright giant or supergiant star that has been assigned stellar classifications of F2II and F0Ib, respectively. It has seven times the mass of the Sun and has expanded to 45 times the Sun's radius. It is spinning with a projected rotational velocity of 22 km/s. The star is radiating 3,466 times the luminosity of the Sun from its enlarged photosphere at an effective temperature of 6,598 K.
