= HD 76728 =

Suspected binary star system in the constellation Carina

- Location of c Carinae (circled in red)

Observation data Epoch J2000.0 Equinox J2000.0
- Constellation: Carina
- Right ascension: 08^{h} 55^{m} 02.82822^{s}
- Declination: −60° 38′ 40.5998″
- Apparent magnitude (V): +3.84

Characteristics
- Spectral type: B8/9II
- B−V color index: −0.104±0.006
- Variable type: Constant

Astrometry
Radial velocity (R_{v})	+25.0±4.1 km/s
Proper motion (μ)	RA: −28.18 mas/yr Dec.: +41.48 mas/yr
Parallax (π)	10.20±0.10 mas
Distance	320 ± 3 ly (98.0 ± 1.0 pc)
Absolute magnitude (M_{V})	−1.12

Details
Radius	4.057 R_{☉}
Luminosity	446 L_{☉}
Temperature	13,180 K

Other designations
- c Car, CPD−60°1243, FK5 336, GC 12359, HD 76728, HIP 43783, HR 3571, SAO 250374, CCDM J08550-6039, WDS J08550-6039A

Database references
SIMBAD	data

HD 76728 is a suspected astrometric binary star system in the constellation Carina. It has the Bayer designation c Carinae; HD 76728 is the identifier from the Henry Draper catalogue. The visible component has a blue-white hue and is visible to the naked eye with an apparent visual magnitude of +3.84. The system is located at a distance of approximately 320 light years from the Sun based on parallax, and it is drifting further away with a radial velocity of around +25 km/s. It is a candidate member of the Volans-Carina Association of co-moving stars.

The visible component is an aging bright giant star with a stellar classification of B8/9II. The spectrum of the star displays metallic lines of magnesium. The Volans-Carina Association to which it belongs has an age of 90 million years. The star has four times the radius of the Sun and is radiating 450 times the Sun's luminosity from its photosphere at an effective temperature of 13,180 K.
