= V357 Carinae =

Binary star in the constellation Carina

- Location of a Carinae (circled in red)

Observation data Epoch J2000.0 Equinox ICRS
- Constellation: Carina
- Right ascension: 09^{h} 10^{m} 58.086^{s}
- Declination: −58° 58′ 0.82″
- Apparent magnitude (V): +3.41 - 3.44

Characteristics
- Spectral type: B2IV-V
- Variable type: Eclipsing

Astrometry
Radial velocity (R_{v})	23.3 km/s
Proper motion (μ)	RA: −16.64 mas/yr Dec.: 15.00 mas/yr
Parallax (π)	7.30±0.35 mas
Distance	450 ± 20 ly (137 ± 7 pc)

Orbit
Period (P)	6.74469 d
Eccentricity (e)	0.18
Semi-amplitude (K_{1}) (primary)	21.5 km/s

Details

Aa1
Mass	8.18 M_{☉}
Radius	5.8 R_{☉}
Luminosity	4,000 L_{☉}
Surface gravity (log g)	4.0 cgs
Temperature	19,150 K
Age	18.7 Myr

Aa2
Mass	1.10 M_{☉}

Other designations
- V357 Car, a Carinae, HR 3659, HD 79351, HIP 45080

Database references
SIMBAD	data

V357 Carinae (a Car, a Carinae) (Note: Pronounced: lower-case /eɪ/ /ˈkærɪnaɪ/ or /kæˈriːnaɪ/) is triple star in the constellation Carina. It is approximately 419 light years from Earth. The mean apparent magnitude of the system is +3.43. Outside of brightly-lit urban areas, it is easily visible to the naked eye. The star appears 46.0' (0.7668°) distant of Iota Carinae at the heart of the asterism and constellation which is skewed in having bulk of the stars away from the eastern, Canopus prow of the ship and close to the imagined sails of the ship, Vela.

== Properties ==
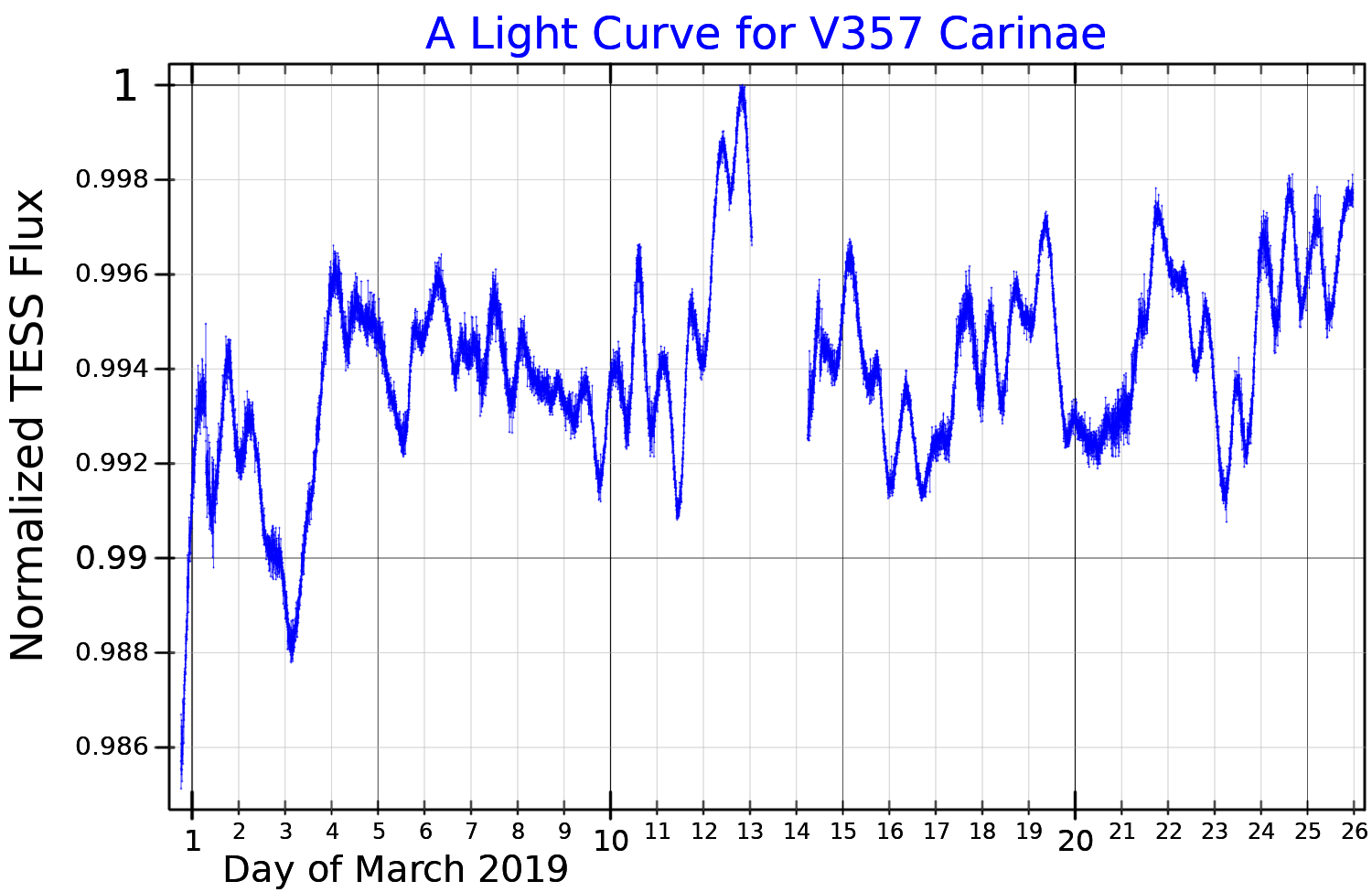
A light curve for V357 Carinae, plotted from TESS data

The two inner components form a single-lined spectroscopic binary with a period of 6.74 days and an eccentricity of 0.18. In 1959, Sergei Illarionovich Gaposchkin announced his discovery that the star, then known as a Carinae, is a variable star. It was given its variable star designation, V357 Carinae, in 1977. The star's brightness varies from magnitude +3.41 to +3.44 with a period of 6.74 days, which is its orbital period. It was classified as an eclipsing binary in Gaposchkin's original catalogue of variable stars, although the variability was often considered doubtful. This subsystem is now thought to be a very shallow eclipsing binary.

a Carinae is also an astrometric binary, meaning its motion in the sky implies orbital motion about an invisible companion. The orbital elements of the third companion are unknown, and it has not yet been detected.
