= HD 76653 =

Star in the constellation Vela

Observation data Epoch J2000.0 Equinox ICRS
- Constellation: Vela
- Right ascension: 08^{h} 55^{m} 11.782^{s}
- Declination: −54° 57′ 56.77″
- Apparent magnitude (V): 5.71

Characteristics
- Evolutionary stage: main sequence
- Spectral type: F6 V
- U−B color index: +0.00
- B−V color index: +0.48

Astrometry
Radial velocity (R_{v})	−5.9±0.4 km/s
Proper motion (μ)	RA: +24.398 mas/yr Dec.: −91.363 mas/yr
Parallax (π)	41.0816±0.0360 mas
Distance	79.39 ± 0.07 ly (24.34 ± 0.02 pc)
Absolute magnitude (M_{V})	+3.79

Details
Mass	1.22 M_{☉}
Radius	1.35±0.02 R_{☉}
Luminosity	2.72 L_{☉}
Surface gravity (log g)	4.28±0.10 cgs
Temperature	6,296±80 K
Metallicity [Fe/H]	−0.01±0.07 dex
Rotational velocity (v sin i)	10.3±0.5 km/s
Age	770±540 Myr

Other designations
- CPD−54°1925, GJ 3519, HD 76653, HIP 43797, HR 3570, SAO 236405

Database references
SIMBAD	data

HD 76653 is a single star in the southern constellation Vela. It is faintly visible to the naked eye with an apparent visual magnitude of +5.71. Based upon an annual parallax shift of 41.08 mas as seen from Earth, it is located 79 light years from the Sun. The star is moving closer to the Sun with a radial velocity of −6 km/s. It is a probable (96% chance) co-moving companion of the nearby Delta Velorum; the two have an estimated physical separation of 2.2 ly (0.6605 pc) with similar proper motions. Both are likely members of the Ursa Major association.

This is an F-type main-sequence star with a stellar classification of F6 V. It is larger than the Sun, with 1.22 times the mass of the Sun and 1.35 times the Sun's luminosity. The star is radiating 2.72 times the Sun's luminosity from its photosphere at an effective temperature of about 6,296 K. Pace (2013) estimates HD 76653 to be 770 million years old, while Fuhrmann and Chini (2012) date it to an age of around two billion years. However, is an X-ray source with a luminosity of 214.3×10^{27} erg s^{−1}, which is unusually high for the older age estimate. The metallicity is near solar and it is spinning with a projected rotational velocity of 10.3 km/s.

HD 76653 displays an infrared excess that suggests the presence of an orbiting debris disk. This excess was detected with the Spitzer Space Telescope both by the IRS instrument at 30−34 μm and weakly by MIPS at 70 μm. The dust has a temperature of about 73−77 K and is orbiting at a mean distance of 16−18 AU from the host star.
