= LHS 288 =

Red dwarf star in the constellation Carina

- Location of LHS 288 in the constellation Carina

Observation data Epoch J2000 Equinox ICRS
- Constellation: Carina
- Right ascension: 10^{h} 44^{m} 21.23291^{s}
- Declination: −61° 12′ 35.2754″
- Apparent magnitude (V): 13.92

Characteristics
- Spectral type: M5V
- B−V color index: 1.82
- V−R color index: 1.59
- R−I color index: 2.02
- J−H color index: 0.442
- J−K color index: 0.764

Astrometry
Radial velocity (R_{v})	155.61±1.27 km/s
Proper motion (μ)	RA: −346.208 mas/yr Dec.: +1,611.100 mas/yr
Parallax (π)	206.9698±0.0448 mas
Distance	15.759 ± 0.003 ly (4.832 ± 0.001 pc)
Absolute magnitude (M_{V})	15.5

Details
Mass	0.1085±0.0091 M_{☉}
Radius	0.1256±0.0042 R_{☉}
Luminosity	(1.152±0.011)×10^{−3} L_{☉}
Surface gravity (log g)	5.10 cgs
Temperature	2,760±150 K
Metallicity [Fe/H]	−0.55±0.20 dex

Other designations
- GJ 3618, L 143-23, LFT 734, LHS 288, LTT 3946, PLX 2511.01

Database references
SIMBAD	data

LHS 288 (Luyten 143-23) is a red dwarf star in the constellation Carina. At a distance of 15.759 light-years (4.831 parsecs), it is among the nearest stars, and is the closest in the constellation. Despite its closeness, the star is far too faint to be seen with the unaided eye, with an apparent magnitude of 13.92.

The spectrum of this star matches a spectral class of M5V, similar to the class of Proxima Centauri. This star has an estimated 0.109 times the Sun's mass, 0.126 times the Sun's radius, and just 1.15% of the solar luminosity. At an effective temperature of 2,760±150 K, it radiates a reddish hue.

A 2007 study suggested that LHS 288 may harbour a planet with a mass of 2.4 M_{J} based on astrometric observations, but the possibility that it passed over an undetected faint star, which could mimic the astrometric variation caused by a planet, could not be eliminated.
