= Iota Carinae =

Star in the constellation Carina

ι Carinae
- Location of ι Carinae (circled in red)

Observation data Epoch J2000 Equinox ICRS
- Constellation: Carina
- Right ascension: 09^{h} 17^{m} 05.40686^{s}
- Declination: −59° 16′ 30.8353″
- Apparent magnitude (V): 2.21

Characteristics
- Evolutionary stage: Supergiant
- Spectral type: A7 Ib
- U−B color index: +0.16
- B−V color index: +0.18
- Variable type: Suspected

Astrometry
Radial velocity (R_{v})	13.3 km/s
Proper motion (μ)	RA: −19.03 mas/yr Dec.: +13.11 mas/yr
Parallax (π)	4.26±0.1 mas
Distance	770 ± 20 ly (235 ± 6 pc)
Absolute magnitude (M_{V})	−5.1

Details
Mass	6.9 M_{☉}
Radius	46.4–50.1 R_{☉}
Luminosity	4,900 L_{☉}
Surface gravity (log g)	1.85±0.1 cgs
Temperature	7,500–7,700 K
Metallicity [Fe/H]	−0.14 dex
Rotational velocity (v sin i)	10.0 km/s
Age	56 Myr

Other designations
- Aspidiske, iota Car, NSV 04444, CD−58°2529, CPD−58°1465, FK5 351, HD 80404, HIP 45556, HR 3699, SAO 236808

Database references
SIMBAD	data

Iota Carinae is a star in the southern constellation of Carina. It has the official name Aspidiske, pronounced /ˌæspɪˈdɪskiː/; Iota Carinae is its Bayer designation, which is Latinized from ι Carinae and abbreviated Iota Car or ι Car. With an apparent visual magnitude of 2.2, it is one of the brighter stars in the night sky.

The star appears 46.0' (0.7668°) WSW of V357 Carinae, a mid-third-magnitude star, also forming part of the asterism and leading to its long, narrow projection which culminates in Canopus.

The star and rest of southern Carina never sets on places from about 34° S southwards including Cape Town; its northernmost viewpoints are unobstructed southern horizons near to the 30th parallel north, once a day.

== Location and Nomenclature ==
ι Carinae (Latinised to Iota Carinae) is the star's Bayer designation.

The star is part of an asterism, the False Cross, from Iota Carinae, Delta Velorum, Kappa Velorum and Epsilon Carinae. The quartet is so called because they are sometimes mistaken for the Southern Cross, causing errors in astronavigation.

It has the traditional cognate names Aspidiske (not be confused with Asmidiske, the proper name of Xi Puppis), Scutulum and Turais (or Tureis, a name shared with Rho Puppis). Turais is the Arabic تُرَيْس turais "small shield" (diminutive), while Aspidiske and Scutulum are Greek and Latin translations from ασπίδα and scūtum. In 2016, the International Astronomical Union formed its Working Group on Star Names (WGSN) to catalog and standardize proper names for stars. The WGSN's first bulletin of July 2016 included a table of the first two batches of names it approved which included Aspidiske for this star.

In Chinese, 海石 (Hǎi Shí), meaning Sea Rock, refers to an asterism consisting of Iota Carinae, Epsilon Carinae, HD 83183, HD 84810 and Upsilon Carinae. Consequently, Iota Carinae itself is known as 海石二 (Hǎi Shí èr, English: the Second Star of Sea Rock).

== Properties ==
Based on parallax measurements this star is about 770 light-years (240 parsecs) from the Earth. It has a stellar classification of A7 Ib, with the luminosity class of 'Ib' indicating it has reached the stage of its evolution where it has expanded to become a lower-luminosity supergiant. It is just entering the Hertzsprung gap of the Hertzsprung–Russell diagram, and is evolving towards a red supergiant phase.

Iota Carinae has around seven times the Sun's mass and has expanded to roughly 50 times the Sun's radius. It is radiating about 4,900 times the luminosity of the Sun. However, this luminosity appears to vary, causing the star's apparent magnitude to range between 2.23 and 2.28. This energy is being radiated into space from the star's outer envelope at an effective temperature of 7,500 K, giving Iota Carinae the white hue typical of an A-type star. Being short of the rough initial mass limit above which stars collapse and explode as supernovae, Iota Carinae will likely end its life as a white dwarf with roughly the current mass of the Sun, similar to Sirius B today (which was also estimated to have an initial mass of up to 7 solar masses).

Due to precession of the Earth's axis of rotation, in the next 7,500 years the south celestial pole will pass close to this star and Upsilon Carinae and it will become the South Star around 8100 CE.
