= List of brightest stars =

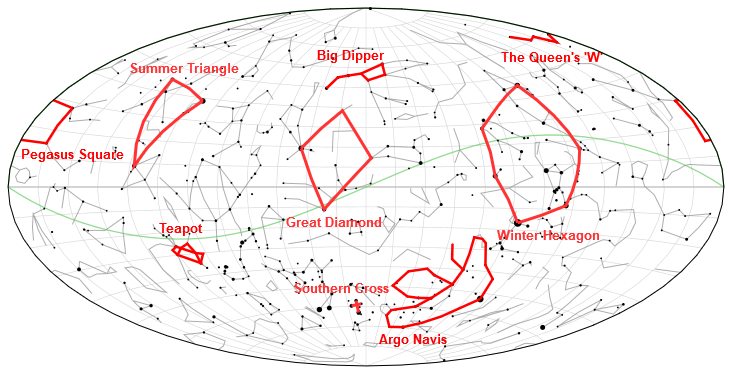
Some major asterisms, which feature many of the brightest stars in the night sky

This is a list of stars arranged by their apparent magnitude – their brightness as observed from Earth. It includes all stars brighter than magnitude +2.50 in visible light, measured using a V-band filter in the UBV photometric system. Stars in binary systems (or other multiples) are listed by their total or combined brightness if they appear as a single star to the naked eye, or listed separately if they do not. As with all magnitude systems in astronomy, the scale is logarithmic and inverted, i.e., lower/more negative numbers are brighter.

Most stars on this list appear bright from Earth because they are nearby, not because they are intrinsically luminous (a factor measured in terms of absolute magnitude).

== Measurement ==
The Sun is the brightest star as viewed from Earth, at −26.78 mag. The second brightest is Sirius at −1.46 mag. For comparison, the brightest non-stellar objects in the Solar System have maximum brightnesses of:

- Moon −12.7 mag
- Venus −4.92 mag
- Jupiter −2.94 mag
- Mars −2.94 mag
- Mercury −2.48 mag
- Saturn −0.55 mag

Any exact order of the visual brightness of stars is not perfectly defined, for four reasons:

- Stellar brightness is based on the apparent visual magnitude as perceived by the human eye, from the brightest stars of 1st magnitude to the faintest at 6th magnitude. Since the invention of the optical telescope and the documenting of binary stars and multiple star systems, stellar brightness could be expressed as either individual (separate) or total (combined) magnitude. The table is ordered by combined magnitude of all naked eye components appearing as if they were single stars. Such multiple star systems are indicated by parentheses showing the individual magnitudes of component stars bright enough to make a detectable contribution. For example, the binary star system Alpha Centauri has the total or combined magnitude of −0.27, while its two component stars have magnitudes of +0.01 and +1.33.
- New or more accurate photometry, standard filters, or adopting differing methods using standard stars can measure stellar magnitudes slightly differently. This may change the apparent order of lists of bright stars. The table shows measured V magnitudes, which use a specific filter that closely approximates human vision. However, other kinds of magnitude systems do exist based on different wavelengths, some well away from the distribution of the visible wavelengths of light, and these apparent magnitudes vary dramatically in the different systems. For example, Betelgeuse has the K-band (infrared) apparent magnitude of −4.05.
- Some stars, like Betelgeuse and Antares, are variable stars, changing their magnitude over days, months or years. In the table, the range of variation is indicated with the symbol "var". Single magnitude values quoted for variable stars come from a variety of sources. Magnitudes shown in the table are either when the stars are at maximum brightness, which is repeated for every cycle (e.g. the eclipsing binary Algol); or, if the variations are small, a simple average magnitude. For red variable stars, specifying a single maximum brightness is often difficult because each cycle produces a different maximum brightness; this is thought to be caused by poorly understood pulsations in stellar evolution processes. Such quoted stellar brightness is sometimes based on the average maximum apparent magnitude from estimated maxima over many observed light-curve cycles, sometimes spanning across centuries. Results often quoted in the literature are not necessarily straightforward and may differ in expressing an alternate value for a singular maximum brightness or as a range of values.
- A few selected stars, thought to be uniformly fixed in brightness, are used as standard stars. These standard stars have carefully determined magnitudes that have been analysed over many years, and are often used to determine other stars' magnitudes or their stellar parameters using comparatively consistent scales.

== Nomenclature ==
All of these stars have multiple valid names or catalogue designations. The table lists their Bayer designation and the most common proper name. Most of the proper names have been approved by the Working Group on Star Names of the International Astronomical Union (IAU). Popular names which have not been approved by the IAU are omitted.

== Table ==
Legend
Wolf–Rayet star
O-type star
B-type star
A-type star
F-type star
G-type star
K-type star
M-type star

Blue rows indicate the brightest in their constellation

Rank	Visual magnitude (m_{V})	Proper name	Bayer designation	Distance (ly)	Spectral type	Celestial Hemisphere
0	−26.74	Sun (Sol)		0.0000158	G2V	
1	−1.46	Sirius	α Canis Majoris	8.6	A0mA1 Va	Southern
2	−0.74	Canopus	α Carinae	310	A9II	Southern
3	−0.27 (0.01 + 1.33)	Alpha Centauri	α Centauri	4.34	G2V	Southern
3	−0.27 (0.01 + 1.33)	Alpha Centauri	α Centauri	4.34	K1V	Southern
4	−0.05	Arcturus	α Boötis	37	K1.5 III Fe−0.5	Northern
5	0.03 (−0.02–0.07var)	Vega	α Lyrae	25	A0Va	Northern
6	0.08 (0.03–0.16var)	Capella	α Aurigae	43	K0 III, G1 III	Northern
7	0.13 (0.05–0.18var)	Rigel	β Orionis	860	B8 Ia	Southern
8	0.34	Procyon	α Canis Minoris	11	F5 IV-V	Northern
9	0.46 (0.40–0.46var)	Achernar	α Eridani	140	B3 Vpe	Southern
10	0.50 (0.0–1.6var)	Betelgeuse	α Orionis	640	M1-M2 Ia-ab	Northern
11	0.61	Hadar	β Centauri	390	B1 III	Southern
12	0.76	Altair	α Aquilae	17	A7 V	Northern
13	0.76 (1.33 + 1.73)	Acrux	α Crucis	320	B0.5 IV, B1 V	Southern
14	0.86 (0.75–0.95var)	Aldebaran	α Tauri	65	K5 III	Northern
15	0.96 (0.6–1.6var)	Antares	α Scorpii	550	M1.5 Iab-Ib, B2.5 V	Southern
16	0.97 (0.97–1.04var)	Spica	α Virginis	250	B1 III-IV, B2 V	Southern
17	1.14	Pollux	β Geminorum	34	K0 III	Northern
18	1.16	Fomalhaut	α Piscis Austrini	25	A3 V	Southern
19	1.25 (1.21–1.29var)	Deneb	α Cygni	2,600	A2 Ia	Northern
20	1.25 (1.23–1.31var)	Mimosa	β Crucis	280	B0.5 III, B2 V	Southern
21	1.39	Regulus	α Leonis	79	B8 IVn	Northern
22	1.50	Adhara	ε Canis Majoris	430	B2 II	Southern
23	1.58 (1.93 + 2.97)	Castor	α Geminorum	51	A1 V, Am	Northern
24	1.63	Shaula	λ Scorpii	570	B2 IV	Southern
25	1.64	Gacrux	γ Crucis	89	M3.5 III	Southern
26	1.64	Bellatrix	γ Orionis	250	B2 III	Northern
27	1.65	Elnath	β Tauri/γ Aurigae	130	B7 III	Northern
28	1.69	Miaplacidus	β Carinae	110	A1 III	Southern
29	1.69 (1.64–1.74var)	Alnilam	ε Orionis	1,180	B0 Ia	Southern
30	1.74	Alnair	α Gruis	100	B6 V	Southern
31	1.77	Alnitak	ζ Orionis	1,300	O9.5 Iab, B1 IV, B0 III	Southern
32	1.77	Alioth	ε Ursae Majoris	83	A1 III-IVp kB9	Northern
33	1.79	Dubhe	α Ursae Majoris	120	K0 III, F0 V	Northern
34	1.82	Mirfak	α Persei	510	F5 Ib	Northern
35	1.82	Wezen	δ Canis Majoris	1,800	F8 Ia	Southern
36	1.83 (1.81–1.87var + 4.27)	–	γ Velorum	840	WC8, O7.5III	Southern
37	1.84	Sargas	θ Scorpii	330	F0 II	Southern
38	1.85	Kaus Australis	ε Sagittarii	140	B9.5 III	Southern
39	1.86	Avior	ε Carinae	600	K3 III, B2 Vp	Southern
40	1.86	Alkaid	η Ursae Majoris	100	B3 V	Northern
41	1.90 (1.89–1.94var)	Menkalinan	β Aurigae	80	A1mIV+A1mIV	Northern
42	1.91	Atria	α Trianguli Australis	390	K2 IIb-IIIa	Southern
43	1.92	Alhena	γ Geminorum	100	A1.5 IV+	Northern
44	1.94	Peacock	α Pavonis	180	B3 V	Southern
45	1.96 (1.99–2.39var + 5.57)	Alsephina	δ Velorum	80	A1 Va(n), F7.5 V	Southern
46	1.98	Mirzam	β Canis Majoris	500	B1 II-III	Southern
47	1.98 (1.86–2.13var)	Polaris	α Ursae Minoris	430	F7 Ib	Northern
48	2.00	Alphard	α Hydrae	180	K3 II-III	Southern
49	2.00	Hamal	α Arietis	66	K1 IIIb	Northern
50	2.02	Diphda	β Ceti	96	K0 III	Southern
51	2.04	Mizar	ζ Ursae Majoris	83	A2 Vp, A2 Vp, Am	Northern
52	2.05	Nunki	σ Sagittarii	230	B2.5 V	Southern
53	2.06	Menkent	θ Centauri	59	K0 III	Southern
54	2.06	Alpheratz	α Andromedae	97	B8 IVpMnHg, A3 V	Northern
55	2.07 (2.01–2.10var)	Mirach	β Andromedae	200	M0 III	Northern
56	2.07	Rasalhague	α Ophiuchi	47	A5IVnn	Northern
57	2.08 (2.37 + 3.64)	Algieba	γ Leonis	130	K0 III, G7 IIIb	Northern
58	2.08	Kochab	β Ursae Minoris	130	K4 III	Northern
59	2.09	Saiph	κ Orionis	650	B0.5 Ia	Southern
60	2.11	Denebola	β Leonis	36	A3 Va	Northern
61	2.12 (2.1–3.39var)	Algol	β Persei	93	B8 V, K0 IV, A7m	Northern
62	2.15 (2.0–2.3var)	Tiaki	β Gruis	170	M5 III	Southern
63	2.17	Muhlifain	γ Centauri	130	A0 III, A0 III	Southern
64	2.21	Aspidiske	ι Carinae	690	A9 Ib	Southern
65	2.21 (2.14–2.30var)	Suhail	λ Velorum	570	K4 Ib	Southern
66	2.23 (2.21–2.32var)	Alphecca	α Coronae Borealis	75	A0 V, G5 V	Northern
67	2.23 (2.23–2.35var)	Mintaka	δ Orionis	900	O9.5 II, B1 V, B0 IV	Southern
68	2.23	Sadr	γ Cygni	1,500	F8 Iab	Northern
69	2.23	Eltanin	γ Draconis	150	K5 III	Northern
70	2.24	Schedar	α Cassiopeiae	230	K0 IIIa	Northern
71	2.25	Naos	ζ Puppis	1,080	O4 If(n)p	Southern
72	2.26	Almach	γ Andromedae	350	K3 IIb, B9.5 V, B9.5 V, A0 V	Northern
73	2.28 (2.25–2.31var)	Caph	β Cassiopeiae	54	F2 III	Northern
74	2.29	Izar	ε Boötis	202	K0 II-III, A2 V	Northern
75	2.30 (2.29–2.34var)	Uridim	α Lupi	550	B1.5 III	Southern
76	2.30 (2.29–2.31var)	—	ε Centauri	380	B1III	Southern
77	2.31 (1.6–2.32var)	Dschubba	δ Scorpii	400	B0.3 IV, B1-3 V	Southern
78	2.31	Larawag	ε Scorpii	65	K1 III	Southern
79	2.35 (2.30–2.41var)	—	η Centauri	310	B1.5 Vne	Southern
80	2.37	Merak	β Ursae Majoris	79	A1 IVps	Northern
81	2.38	Ankaa	α Phoenicis	77	K0.5 IIIb	Southern
82	2.39	Girtab	κ Scorpii	460	B1.5 III	Southern
83	2.40 (0.7–3.0var)	Enif	ε Pegasi	670	K2 Ib	Northern
84	2.42 (2.31–2.74var)	Scheat	β Pegasi	200	M2.5 II-IIIe	Northern
85	2.43	Sabik	η Ophiuchi	88	A1 IV, A1 IV	Southern
86	2.44	Phecda	γ Ursae Majoris	83	A0 Ve	Northern
87	2.45	Aludra	η Canis Majoris	2,000	B5 Ia	Southern
88	2.46	Alderamin	α Cephei	49	A8Vn	Northern
89	2.46	Markeb	κ Velorum	540	B2 IV	Southern
90	2.47 (1.6–3.0var)	Tiansi	γ Cassiopeiae	610	B0.5 IVe	Northern
91	2.48	Markab	α Pegasi	140	A0 IV	Northern
92	2.48	Aljanah	ε Cygni	72	K0 III-IV	Northern
93	2.50	Acrab	β Scorpii	404	B0.5 IV-V, B1.5 V, B2 V	Southern

== Brightest star by galaxy ==
Galaxy	Star	Distance (ly)	Spectral type	Apparent Magnitude	Absolute Magnitude	Notes
Milky Way	Sun	0	G2V	–26.74	4.83	
Milky Way	Sirius	8.6	A0mA1 Va	−1.46	+1.43	
Large Magellanic Cloud	HD 33579	163,000	A3Ia^{+}	8.99 – 9.22 (variable)	−9.57	The Luminous Blue Variables S Doradus and R71 are brighter during their outbursts.
Small Magellanic Cloud	SK 69	200,000	B8Ia	10.47		
Andromeda Galaxy	[DMM2009] J004406.32+420131	2,500,000	F2Ia	15.6		
Triangulum Galaxy	B324	3,200,000	A8–F0Ia	14.859	–10.2	A yellow hypergiant.

== See also ==
- Lists of stars
- IAU designated constellations by solid angle
- Historical brightest stars, the brightest star in Earth's night sky at each period within the last or next 5 million years
- Limiting magnitude
- List of variable stars
- List of brightest natural objects in the sky
- List of most massive stars
- List of most luminous stars
- List of nearest bright stars
- List of nearest stars
- Stars in fiction
- First-magnitude star
