= Upsilon Carinae =

Binary star in the constellation Carina

υ Carinae
- Location of υ Carinae (circled)

Observation data Epoch J2000 Equinox J2000
- Constellation: Carina
- Right ascension: 09^{h} 47^{m} 06.12170^{s}
- Declination: −65° 04′ 19.2267″
- Apparent magnitude (V): 2.97 (+3.08/+6.25)

Characteristics
- Spectral type: A8 Ib + B7 III
- U−B color index: +0.13
- B−V color index: +0.27

Astrometry
Radial velocity (R_{v})	+13.6±0.5 km/s
Proper motion (μ)	RA: −11.51 mas/yr Dec.: +4.71 mas/yr
Parallax (π)	2.27±0.28 mas
Distance	approx. 1,400 ly (approx. 440 pc)
Absolute magnitude (M_{V})	−5.26

Details

υ Car A
Mass	10.88 M_{☉}
Radius	96.6 – 100 R_{☉}
Surface gravity (log g)	1.4±0.1 cgs
Temperature	7,500±100 K
Age	23.4 Myr

υ Car B
Mass	8 M_{☉}
Surface gravity (log g)	3.3±0.1 cgs
Temperature	23,000±1,600 K

Other designations
- υ Car, CPD−64°1084, GC 13506, HIP 48002, WDS J09471-6504
- A: HD 85124, HR 3890, SAO 250696
- B: HD 85123, HR 3891, SAO 250695

Database references
SIMBAD	system
- A
- B

Upsilon Carinae is a double star in the southern constellation of Carina. Its name is a Bayer designation that is Latinized from υ Carinae, and abbreviated Upsilon Car or υ Car. This pair is part of the Diamond Cross asterism in southern Carina. The Upsilon Carinae system has a combined apparent magnitude of +2.97 and is approximately 1,400 light years (440 parsecs) from Earth. It is drifting further away with a line of sight velocity of +14 km/s.

In Chinese, 海石 (Hǎi Dàn), meaning Sea Rock, refers to an asterism consisting of υ Carinae, ε Carinae, ι Carinae, HD 83183 and HD 84810. Consequently, υ Carinae itself is known as 海石五 (Hǎi Dàn wǔ, English: the Fifth Star of Sea Rock.)

In the next 7500 years, the south Celestial pole will pass close to these stars and Iota Carinae (8100 CE).

== Properties ==
The primary component, υ Carinae A, has a stellar classification of A8 Ib, making it a supergiant star that has exhausted the hydrogen at its core and evolved away from its brief main sequence lifetime as an B-type star. With an apparent magnitude of +3.08, it has an effective temperature of about 7,500 K, giving it a white hue. The companion, υ Carinae B, is a giant star with a classification of B7 III, although Mandrini and Niemela (1986) suggested it may be a subgiant star with a classification of B4–5 IV. The outer envelope of this star has an effective temperature of around 23,000 K, resulting in the blue-white hue of a B-type star.

The two stars have an angular separation of 5.030 arcseconds. As a binary star system, they would have an estimated orbital period of at least 19,500 years and a present-day separation of around 2,000 Astronomical Units. This system is roughly 12 million years old.
