= Chi Carinae =

Star in the constellation Carina

- Location of χ Carinae (circled)

Observation data Epoch J2000.0 Equinox ICRS
- Constellation: Carina
- Right ascension: 07^{h} 56^{m} 46.690^{s}
- Declination: −52° 58′ 55.95″
- Apparent magnitude (V): +3.6

Characteristics
- Spectral type: B3IVp
- U−B color index: −0.670
- B−V color index: −0.182
- Variable type: None

Astrometry
Radial velocity (R_{v})	+19.4 km/s
Proper motion (μ)	RA: −28.68 mas/yr Dec.: +19.71 mas/yr
Parallax (π)	7.17±0.47 mas
Distance	450 ± 30 ly (139 ± 9 pc)
Absolute magnitude (M_{V})	−2.25

Details
Mass	7.0±0.1 M_{☉}
Radius	5.5 R_{☉}
Luminosity	2,266 L_{☉}
Surface gravity (log g)	3.5 cgs
Temperature	17,200 K
Rotational velocity (v sin i)	110 km/s
Age	39.8±4.7 Myr

Other designations
- χ Car, CPD–52°1343, FK5 303, HD 65575, HIP 38827, HR 3117, SAO 235635

Database references
SIMBAD	data

Chi Carinae is a star in the southern constellation of Carina. Its name is a Bayer designation that is Latinized from χ Carinae (US: /kaɪ kəˈraɪniː/), and abbreviated Chi Car or χ Car. This is a third-magnitude star and is one of the brighter members of the constellation. The distance to the star can be determined directly through parallax measurements, yielding an estimate of roughly 450 light-years (140 parsecs) with a 6.7% margin of error. This star is a suspected astrometric binary, although nothing is known about the companion.

This is a massive star, with about seven times the mass of the Sun. It is about 40 million years old and rotating rapidly; the projected rotational velocity has been measured as high as 110 km s^{−1}. The spectrum of this star matches a stellar classification of B3 IV, with the luminosity class of IV indicating this is likely a subgiant star that has nearly exhausted the supply of hydrogen at its core and is in the process of evolving into a giant star.

In 1969, Chi Carinae was classified as chemically peculiar Ap star because its absorption lines of silicon appeared unusually strong relative to the lines for helium. However, subsequent examination in the ultraviolet band showed the silicon bands were as expected and it was determined the spectra is normal for a star of its type. There is no indication of variability in the star's spectrum. Observation during the Hipparcos mission showed no photometric variability down to a limit of ±0.003 magnitude. For this reason, the star has been ruled out as a Beta Cephei-type variable star.
