= HD 79447 =

Star in the constellation Carina

- Location of i Carinae (circled in red)

Observation data Epoch J2000.0 Equinox ICRS
- Constellation: Carina
- Right ascension: 09^{h} 11^{m} 16.72089^{s}
- Declination: −62° 19′ 01.1295″
- Apparent magnitude (V): +3.96

Characteristics
- Evolutionary stage: main sequence
- Spectral type: B3V
- B−V color index: −0.180±0.006

Astrometry
Radial velocity (R_{v})	+17.5±2.7 km/s
Proper motion (μ)	RA: −37.48 mas/yr Dec.: +14.59 mas/yr
Parallax (π)	6.01±0.12 mas
Distance	540 ± 10 ly (166 ± 3 pc)
Absolute magnitude (M_{V})	−2.14

Details
Mass	7.0±0.1 M_{☉}
Radius	5.6 R_{☉}
Luminosity	2,054.17 L_{☉}
Surface gravity (log g)	3.5±0.1 cgs
Temperature	18,900±500 K
Rotational velocity (v sin i)	0 km/s
Age	39.2±7.0 Myr

Other designations
- i Car, CPD−61°1201, GC 12707, HD 79447, HIP 45101, HR 3663, SAO 250471

Database references
SIMBAD	data

HD 79447 is a single star in the southern constellation of Carina. It has the Bayer designation i Carinae, while HD 79447 is the identifier from the Henry Draper catalogue. This star has a blue-white hue and is visible to the naked eye with an apparent visual magnitude of +3.96. It is located at a distance of approximately 540 light years from the Sun based on parallax, and has an absolute magnitude of −2.14. The star drifted further away with a radial velocity of +18 km/s. It is a candidate member of the Lower Centaurus–Crux group of the Sco OB2 association.

This object is a B-type main-sequence star with a stellar classification of B3V. A surface magnetic field has been detected with a strength on the order of 1 kG. It has an estimated age of around 39 million years with no measured spin rate. The star has about 5.6 times the radius of the Sun and 7 times the Sun's mass. It is radiating over two thousand times the luminosity of the Sun from its photosphere at an effective temperature of 18,900 K.
