= Kappa Velorum =

Binary star system in the constellation Vela

Kappa Velorum (Markeb)
- Location of κ Vel (circled)

Observation data Epoch J2000 Equinox ICRS
- Constellation: Vela
- Right ascension: 09^{h} 22^{m} 06.81761^{s}
- Declination: −55° 00′ 38.4017″
- Apparent magnitude (V): 2.48

Characteristics
- Spectral type: B2 V-IV + BV
- U−B color index: −0.78
- B−V color index: −0.20

Astrometry
Radial velocity (R_{v})	21.8±0.8 km/s
Proper motion (μ)	RA: −11.40 mas/yr Dec.: +11.52 mas/yr
Parallax (π)	5.70±0.30 mas
Distance	570 ± 30 ly (175 ± 9 pc)
Absolute magnitude (M_{V})	−3.74

Orbit
Period (P)	116.795±0.002 days
Semi-major axis (a)	1.28 AU (Note: Calculated using the parallax of 5.7 milliarcseconds and the separation of 7.272 milliarcseconds. 7.272" / 5.70" = 1.28 AU.)
Eccentricity (e)	0.1761±0.0004
Inclination (i)	74.03±0.02°
Longitude of the node (Ω)	109.74±0.03°
Argument of periastron (ω) (secondary)	95.79±0.07°
Semi-amplitude (K_{1}) (primary)	44±1 km/s

Details

A
Mass	13+3 −2 M_{☉}
Radius	11.6 ± 0.9 (Note: Calculated, using the Stefan-Boltzmann law and the star's effective temperature and luminosity, with respect to the solar nominal effective temperature of 5,772 K: $$\sqrt{\biggl(\frac{5,772}{10^{4.26}}\biggr)^4 \cdot 10^{4.12}} = 11.55\ R_\odot.$$) R_{☉}
Luminosity	13,200+1,600 −1,400 L_{☉}
Surface gravity (log g)	3.5 cgs
Temperature	18,200±400 K
Metallicity [Fe/H]	−0.3 dex
Rotational velocity (v sin i)	39 km/s
Age	40 Myr

B
Mass	7.7+0.9 −0.8 M_{☉}
Temperature	19,000 K
Metallicity [Fe/H]	−0.3 dex
Age	40 Myr

Other designations
- Markeb, HR 3734, HD 81188, SAO 236891, FK5 353, CPD−54°2219, GC 12938, HIP 45941

Database references
SIMBAD	data

Kappa Velorum (κ Velorum, abbreviated Kappa Vel or κ Vel; proper name Markeb /ˈmɑːrkɛb/) is star system in the southern constellation of Vela. It is a binary star consisting of two components, designated A and B; κ Vel A is by far the brighter of the two, so dominates the combined light.

From parallax measurements, this system is located at a distance of roughly 572 light-years (175 parsecs) from the Sun. The apparent visual magnitude is 2.48, making it readily visible to the naked eye in the southern hemisphere. It forms part of an asterism known as the False Cross along with Delta Velorum, Iota Carinae and Epsilon Carinae, so called because it is sometimes mistaken for the Southern Cross, causing errors in astronavigation.

== Nomenclature ==
κ Velorum (Latinised to Kappa Velorum) is the system's Bayer designation. The designations of the two components as Kappa Velorum A and B derives from the convention used by the Washington Multiplicity Catalog (WMC) for multiple star systems, and adopted by the International Astronomical Union (IAU).

The system had a traditional name Markab, from the Arabic مركب, markab meaning "something to ride". It was often spelled Markeb to distinguish it from Alpha Pegasi, which was also traditionally called Markab. In 2016, the IAU organized a Working Group on Star Names (WGSN) to catalog and standardize proper names for stars. The WGSN approved the name Markeb for Kappa Velorum A on 5 September 2017. Markab had previously been approved for Alpha Pegasi on 30 June 2016. Both are now included in the List of IAU-approved Star Names.

In Chinese, 天社 (Tiān Shè), meaning Celestial Earth God's Temple, refers to an asterism consisting of Kappa Velorum, Gamma^{2} Velorum, b Velorum and Delta Velorum. Consequently, Kappa Velorum itself is known as 天社五 (Tiān Shè wǔ), "the Fifth Star of Celestial Earth God's Temple".

== Properties ==
Kappa Velorum is a spectroscopic binary system consisting of a pair of stars that complete an orbit around each other with a period of 116.80 days, a semi-major axis of 1.28 AU and an eccentricity of 0.1761.

The primary's stellar classification of the pair is B2 V – IV, which matches the class of a B-type star that is exhausting the hydrogen at its core and has begun to evolve into a subgiant star. It is about 13 times more massive than the Sun, with a photospheric radius twelve times larger, irradiating 13,000 times more luminosity than the Sun at an effective temperature of 18,000 K, which give Kappa Velorum A the blue-white hue typical of B-type stars.

The secondary is a B-type main-sequence star much less luminous than the primary. It has 7.7 times the mass of the Sun and an effective temperature of 19,000 K, also giving it a blue-white hue.

=== Interstellar medium ===
Analysis of the spectrum of Kappa Velorum shows absorption lines due to the interstellar medium between Earth and the star. Observation of these features over many years has shown that the lines vary in strength, probably caused by a small dense cloud extending 100–1,000 au moving across the line of sight.
