= HD 83183 =

Star in the constellation Carina

- Location of HD 83183 (circled in red)

Observation data Epoch J2000.0 Equinox ICRS
- Constellation: Carina
- Right ascension: 09^{h} 34^{m} 26.65081^{s}
- Declination: −59° 13′ 47.1070″
- Apparent magnitude (V): 4.08

Characteristics
- Spectral type: B5 II
- B−V color index: −0.013±0.003

Astrometry
Radial velocity (R_{v})	+18.2±0.6 km/s
Proper motion (μ)	RA: −10.74 mas/yr Dec.: +6.60 mas/yr
Parallax (π)	2.46±0.10 mas
Distance	1,330 ± 50 ly (410 ± 20 pc)
Absolute magnitude (M_{V})	−3.96

Details
Mass	9.4±0.5 M_{☉}
Radius	18 R_{☉}
Luminosity	11,634 L_{☉}
Surface gravity (log g)	2.50 cgs
Temperature	14,300 K
Rotational velocity (v sin i)	19±4 km/s
Age	24.5±3.8 Myr

Other designations
- h Car, CPD−58°1576, GC 13246, HD 83183, HIP 46974, HR 3825, SAO 237117

Database references
SIMBAD	data

HD 83183 is a single star in the southern constellation of Carina. It has the Bayer designation h Carinae, while HD 83183 is the star's identifier from the Henry Draper catalogue. The star is blue-white in hue and is faintly visible to the naked eye with an apparent visual magnitude of 4.08. It is located at a distance of approximately 1,330 light years based on parallax, and is drifting further away with a radial velocity of +18 km/s. O. J. Eggen identified it as a member of the Pleiades group of co-moving stars.

This object is a massive bright giant star with a stellar classification of B5 II. It is 25 million years old and is spinning with a projected rotational velocity of 19 km/s. The star has 9 times the mass of the Sun and about 18 times the Sun's radius. It is radiating 11,634 times the luminosity of the Sun from its enlarged photosphere at an effective temperature of 14,300 K.
