= HD 84810 =

Star in the constellation Carina

ℓ Carinae
- Location of l Carinae (circled in red)

Observation data Epoch J2000 Equinox ICRS
- Constellation: Carina
- Right ascension: 09^{h} 45^{m} 14.81122^{s}
- Declination: −62° 30′ 28.4519″
- Apparent magnitude (V): 3.35 - 4.06

Characteristics
- Spectral type: G5 Iab/Ib; F6Ib-K0Ib
- U−B color index: +0.76
- B−V color index: +1.03
- Variable type: Classical Cepheid

Astrometry
Radial velocity (R_{v})	+3.3 km/s
Proper motion (μ)	RA: −12.88 mas/yr Dec.: +8.19 mas/yr
Parallax (π)	2.01±0.20 mas
Distance	498+55 −45 pc
Absolute magnitude (M_{V})	−5.22

Details
Mass	8.66±0.14 M_{☉}
Radius	169±8 R_{☉}
Luminosity	11,482 L_{☉}
Surface gravity (log g)	1.5 cgs
Temperature	5,000±60 K
Metallicity [Fe/H]	0.30 dex
Age	31.25±1.05 Myr

Other designations
- l Carinae, 2MASS J09451481-6230284, CD−61°2349, FK5 1254, HD 84810, HIP 47854, HR 3884, IRAS 09438-6216, SAO 250683

Database references
SIMBAD	data

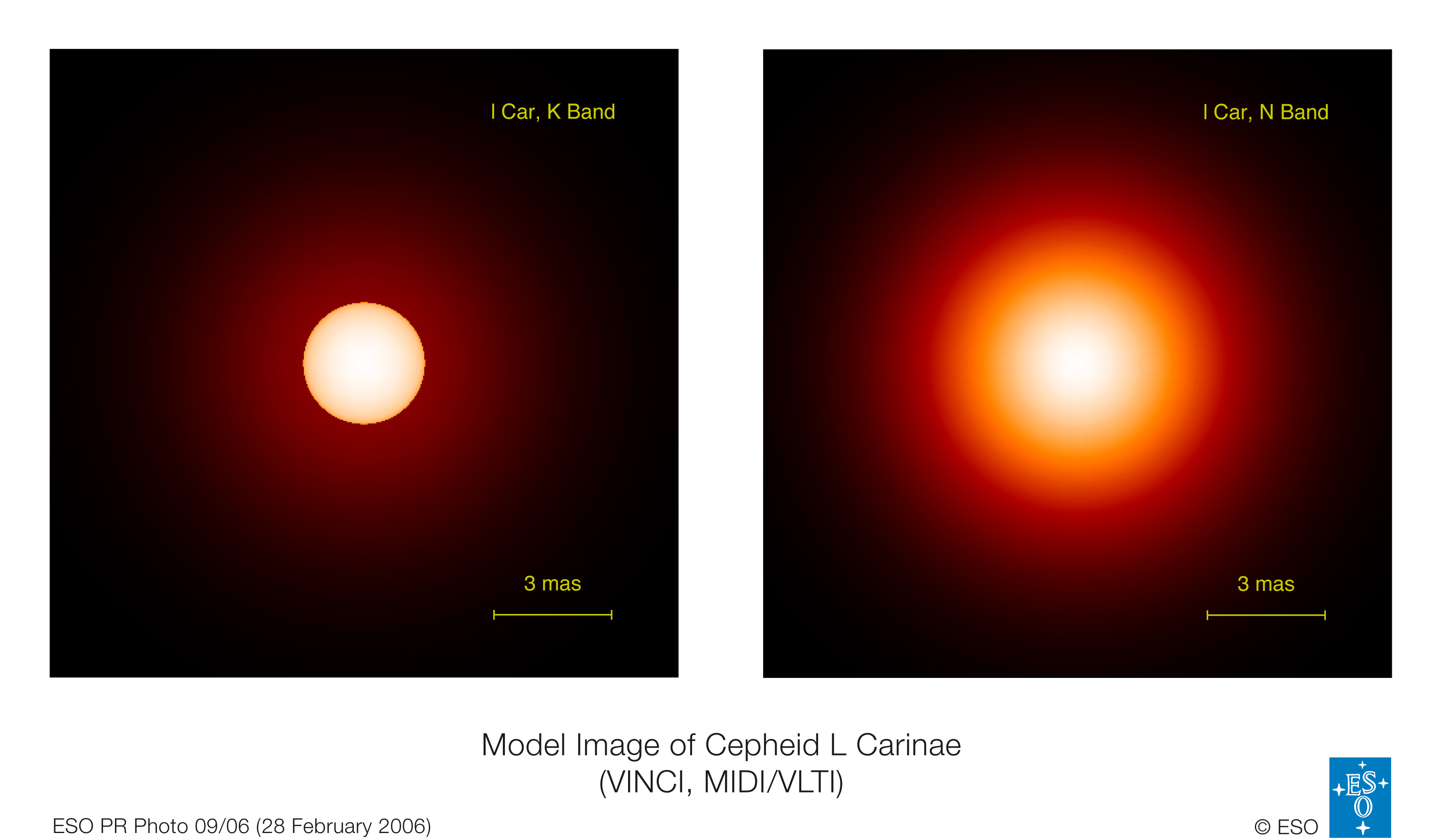
ESO - Model Image of Cepheid l Carinae

HD 84810, also known as l Carinae (l Car), is a star in the southern constellation of Carina. Its apparent magnitude varies from about 3.4 to 4.1, making it readily visible to the naked eye and one of the brightest members of Carina. Based upon parallax measurements, it is approximately 1,600 light-years (490 parsecs) from Earth.

From the characteristics of its spectrum, l Carinae has a stellar classification of G5 Iab/Ib. This indicates the star has reached a stage in its evolution where it has expanded to become a supergiant with 169 times the radius of the Sun. As this is a massive star with 8.7 times the mass of the Sun, it rapidly burns through its supply of nuclear fuel and has become a supergiant in roughly 17-19 million years, after spending 15–17 million years as a main sequence star.

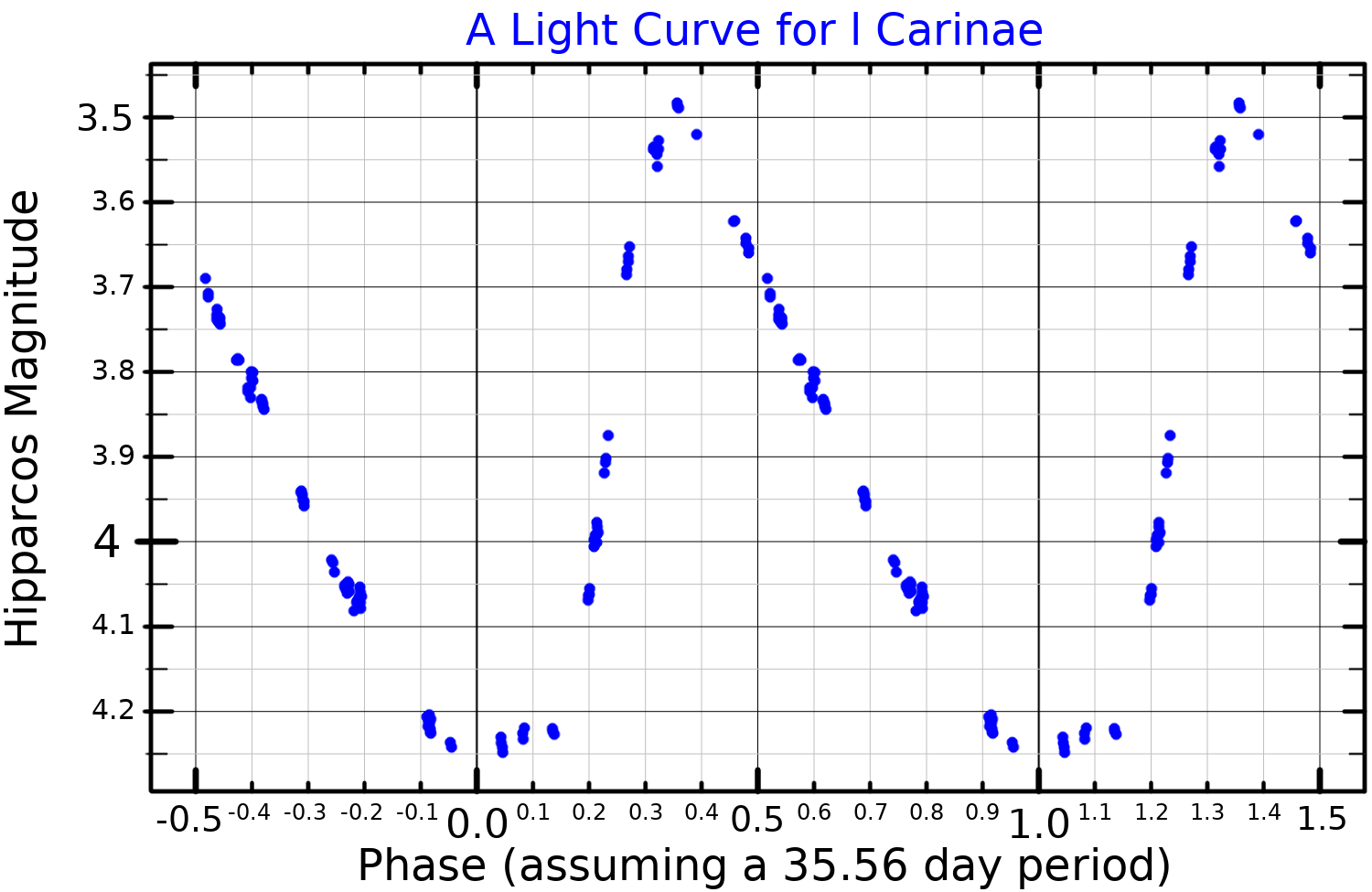
A light curve for l Carinae, plotted from Hipparcos data

l Carinae is classified as a Cepheid variable star and its brightness varies over an amplitude range of 0.725 in magnitude with a long period of 35.560 days. This unusually long period makes it essential for calibrating the period–luminosity relation for Cepheid variables; additionally, it is one of the nearest Cepheid variables, making it relatively easy to observe. The radial velocity of the star likewise varies by 39 km/s during each pulsation cycle. Its radius varies by about 40 R_{☉} as it pulsates, reaching maximum size as its brightness is decreasing towards minimum.

It has a compact circumstellar envelope that can be discerned using interferometry. The envelope has been resolved at an infrared wavelength of 10μm, showing a radius of 10–100 AU at a mean temperature of 100 K. The material for this envelope was supplied by mass ejected from the central star.

The period of l Carinae is calculated to be slowly increasing and it is thought to be crossing the instability strip for the third time, cooling as it evolves towards a red supergiant after a blue loop.
