= Carina (constellation) =

Constellation in the southern celestial hemisphere

- Constellation
- List of stars in Carina
- Abbreviation: Car
- Genitive: Carinae
- Pronunciation: /kəˈraɪnə, kəˈriːnə/ kə-RY-nə, -REE-, genitive /kəˈraɪniː/ kə-RY-nee
- Symbolism: the keel
- Right ascension: 06^{h} 02^{m} 59.7365^{s}–11^{h} 20^{m} 37.4211^{s}
- Declination: −50.7545471°–−75.6840134°
- Area: 494 sq. deg. (34th)
- Main stars: 9
- Bayer/Flamsteed stars: 52
- Stars brighter than 3.00^{m}: 6
- Stars within 10.00 pc (32.62 ly): 2
- Brightest star: Canopus (α Car) (−0.72^{m})
- Nearest star: LHS 288
- Messier objects: 0
- Meteor showers: Alpha Carinids; Eta Carinids
- Bordering constellations: Vela; Puppis; Pictor; Volans; Chamaeleon; Musca; Centaurus
- Visible at latitudes between +20° and −90°. Best visible at 21:00 (9 p.m.) during the month of March.

Carina (/kəˈraɪnə, kəˈriːnə/ kə-RY-nə, -REE-) is a constellation in the southern sky. Its name is Latin for the keel of a ship, and it was the southern foundation of the larger constellation of Argo Navis (the ship Argo) until it was divided into three pieces, the other two being Puppis (the poop deck) and Vela (the sails of the ship).

== History and mythology ==
In ancient Egypt, the constellation was associated with Osiris.

Carina was once a part of Argo Navis, based upon the great ship of the mythical Jason and the Argonauts who searched for the Golden Fleece. The constellation of Argo was introduced in ancient Greece. However, due to the massive size of Argo Navis and the sheer number of stars that required separate designation, Nicolas-Louis de Lacaille divided Argo into three sections in 1763, including Carina (the hull or keel). In the 19th century, these three became established as separate constellations, and were formally included in the list of 88 modern IAU constellations in 1930. Lacaille kept a single set of Greek letters for the whole of Argo, and separate sets of Latin letter designations for each of the three sections. Therefore, Carina has the α, β and ε, Vela has γ and δ, Puppis has ζ, and so on.

== Features ==
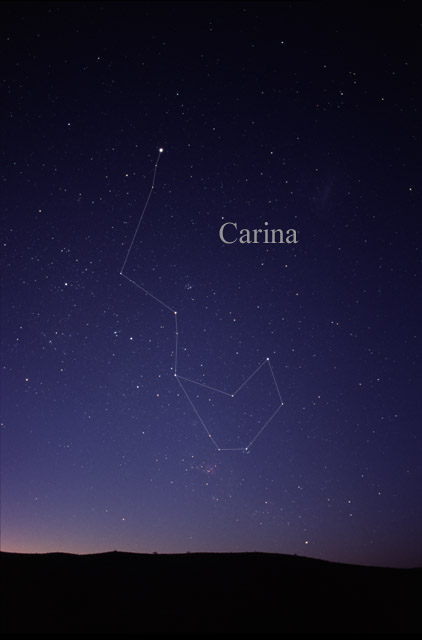
The constellation Carina as it can be seen by the naked eye

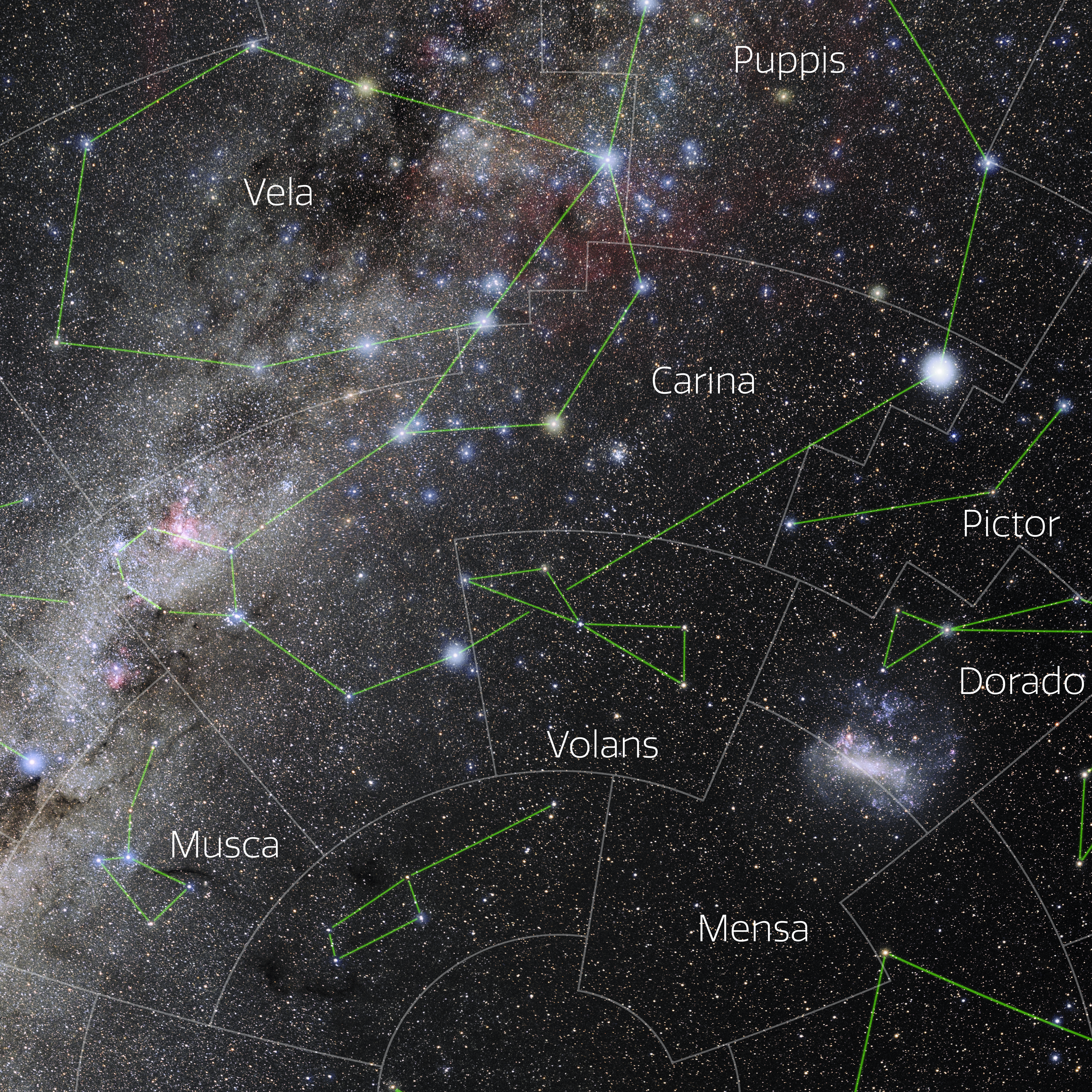
The constellation Carina showing the IAU boundaries, the constellation stick figure, and labels for its brightest stars. Astrophotograph by Eckhard Slawik, from NOIRLab's 88 Constellations project.

=== Stars ===
Carina contains Canopus, a white-hued bright giant that is the second-brightest star in the night sky at magnitude −0.72. Alpha Carinae, as Canopus is formally designated, is 313 light-years from Earth. Its traditional name comes from the mythological Canopus, who was a navigator for Menelaus, king of Sparta.

There are several other stars above magnitude 3 in Carina. Beta Carinae, traditionally called Miaplacidus, is a blue-white-hued star of magnitude 1.7, 111 light-years from Earth. Epsilon Carinae (Avior) is an orange-hued giant star similarly bright to Miaplacidus at magnitude 1.9; it is 630 light-years from Earth. Another fairly bright star is the blue-white-hued Theta Carinae; it is a magnitude 2.7 star 440 light-years from Earth. Theta Carinae is also the most prominent member of the cluster IC 2602. Iota Carinae is a white-hued supergiant star of magnitude 2.2, 690 light-years from Earth.

Eta Carinae is the most prominent variable star in Carina, with a mass of approximately 100 solar masses and 4 million times as bright as the Sun. It was first discovered to be unusual in 1677, when its magnitude suddenly rose to 4, attracting the attention of Edmond Halley. Eta Carinae is inside NGC 3372, commonly called the Carina Nebula. It had a long outburst in 1827, when it brightened to magnitude 1, only fading to magnitude 1.5 in 1828. Its most prominent outburst made Eta Carinae the equal of Sirius; it brightened to magnitude −1.5 in 1843. In the decades following 1843 it appeared relatively placid, having a magnitude between 6.5 and 7.9. However, in 1998, it brightened again, but only to magnitude 5.0, a far less drastic outburst. Eta Carinae is a binary star, with a companion that has a period of 5.5 years; the two stars are surrounded by the Homunculus Nebula, which is composed of gas that was ejected in 1843.

There are several less prominent variable stars in Carina. HD 84810 is a Cepheid variable noted for its brightness; it is the brightest Cepheid that is variable to the unaided eye. It is a yellow-hued supergiant star with a minimum magnitude of 4.2 and a maximum magnitude of 3.3; it has a period of 35.5 days.

V382 Carinae is a yellow hypergiant, one of the rarest types of stars. It is a slow irregular variable, with a minimum magnitude of 4.05 and a maximum magnitude of 3.77. As a hypergiant, V382 Carinae is a luminous star, with 212,000 times more luminosity than the Sun and over 480 times the Sun's size.

Two bright Mira variable stars are in Carina: R Carinae and S Carinae; both stars are red giants. R Carinae has a minimum magnitude of 10.0 and a maximum magnitude of 4.0. Its period is 309 days and it is 416 light-years from Earth. S Carinae is similar, with a minimum magnitude of 10.0 and a maximum magnitude of 5.0. However, S Carinae has a shorter period—150 days, though it is much more distant at 1,300 light-years from Earth.

Carina is home to several double stars and binary stars. Upsilon Carinae is a binary star with two blue-white-hued giant components, 1,600 light-years from Earth. The primary is of magnitude 3.0 and the secondary is of magnitude 6.0; the two components are distinguishable in a small amateur telescope.

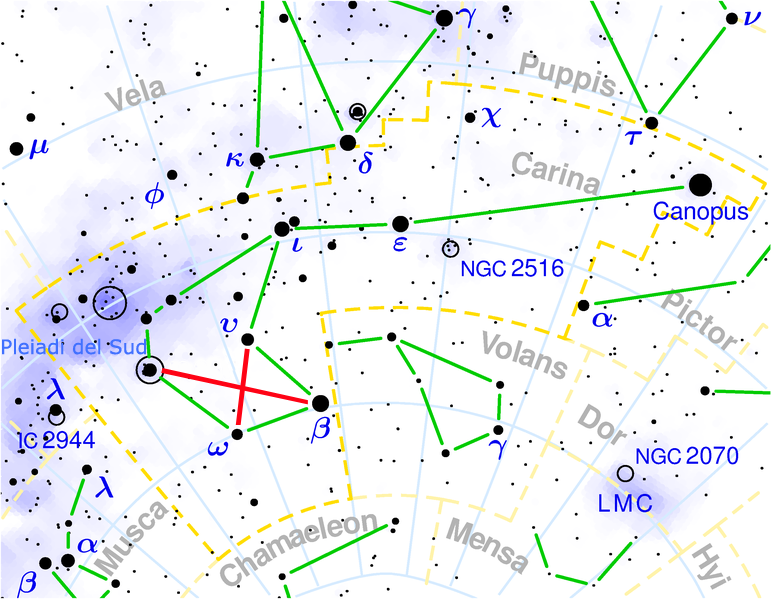
The Diamond Cross highlighted in the constellation of Carina

Two asterisms are prominent in Carina. The 'Diamond Cross' is composed of the stars Beta, Theta, Upsilon and Omega Carinae. The Diamond Cross is visible south of 20ºN latitude, and is larger but fainter than the Southern Cross in Crux. Flanking the Diamond Cross is the False Cross, composed of four stars, with two stars in Carina, Iota Carinae and Epsilon Carinae, and two stars in Vela, Kappa Velorum and Delta Velorum. It is often mistaken for the Southern Cross, causing errors in astronavigation.

=== Deep-sky objects ===
Carina is known for its namesake nebula, NGC 3372, discovered by French astronomer Nicolas-Louis de Lacaille in 1751, which contains several nebulae. The Carina Nebula overall is an extended emission nebula approximately 8,000 light-years away and 300 light-years wide that includes vast star-forming regions. It has an overall magnitude of 8.0 and an apparent diameter of over 2 degrees. Its central region is called the Keyhole, or the Keyhole Nebula. This was described in 1847 by John Herschel, and likened to a keyhole by Emma Converse in 1873. The Keyhole is about seven light-years wide and is composed mostly of ionized hydrogen, with two major star-forming regions. The Homunculus Nebula is a planetary nebula visible to the naked eye that is being ejected by the erratic luminous blue variable star Eta Carinae, the most massive visible star known. Eta Carinae is so massive that it has reached the theoretical upper limit for the mass of a star and is therefore unstable. It is known for its outbursts; in 1840 it briefly became one of the brightest stars in the sky due to a particularly massive outburst, which largely created the Homunculus Nebula. Because of this instability and history of outbursts, Eta Carinae is considered a prime supernova candidate for the next several hundred thousand years because it has reached the end of its estimated million-year life span.

NGC 2516 is an open cluster that is both quite large (approximately half a degree square) and bright, visible to the unaided eye. It is located 1,100 light-years from Earth and has approximately 80 stars, the brightest of which is a red giant star of magnitude 5.2. NGC 3114 is another open cluster approximately of the same size, though it is more distant at 3,000 light-years from Earth. It is more loose and dim than NGC 2516, as its brightest stars are only 6th magnitude. The most prominent open cluster in Carina is IC 2602, also called the "Southern Pleiades". It contains Theta Carinae, along with several other stars visible to the unaided eye. In total, the cluster possesses approximately 60 stars. The Southern Pleiades is particularly large for an open cluster, with a diameter of approximately one degree. Like IC 2602, NGC 3532 is visible to the unaided eye and is of comparable size. It possesses approximately 150 stars that are arranged in an unusual shape, approximating an ellipse with a dark central area. Several prominent orange giants are among the cluster's bright stars, of the 7th magnitude. Superimposed on the cluster is Chi Carinae, a yellow-white-hued star of magnitude 3.9, far more distant than NGC 3532.

Carina also contains the naked-eye globular cluster NGC 2808. Epsilon Carinae and Upsilon Carinae are double stars visible in small telescopes.

One noted galaxy cluster is 1E 0657-56, the Bullet Cluster. At a distance of 4 billion light-years (redshift 0.296), this galaxy cluster is named for the shock wave seen in the intracluster medium, which resembles the shock wave of a supersonic bullet. The bow shock visible is thought to be due to the smaller galaxy cluster moving through the intracluster medium at a relative speed of 3,000–4,000 kilometers per second to the larger cluster. Because this gravitational interaction has been ongoing for hundreds of millions of years, the smaller cluster is being destroyed and will eventually merge with the larger cluster.

=== Meteor showers ===
Carina contains the radiant of the Eta Carinids meteor shower, which peaks around 14 to 21 on January each year.

== Equivalents ==
From China (especially northern China), the stars of Carina can barely be seen. The star Canopus (south polar star and the Star of the Old Man in Chinese astronomy) was located by Chinese astronomers in the Vermilion Bird of the South (南方朱雀, Nán Fāng Zhū Què). The rest of the stars were first classified by Xu Guangqi during the Ming dynasty, based on the knowledge acquired from western star charts, and placed among The Southern Asterisms (近南極星區, Jìnnánjíxīngōu).

Polynesian peoples had no name for the constellation in particular, though they had many names for Canopus. The Māori name Ariki ("High-born"), and the Hawaiian Ke Alii-o-kona-i-ka-lewa, "The Chief of the southern expanse" both attest to the star's prominence in the southern sky, while the Māori Atutahi, "First-light" or "Single-light", and the Tuamotu Te Tau-rari and Marere-te-tavahi, "He who stands alone". refer to the star's solitary nature. It was also called Kapae-poto ("Short horizon"), because it rarely sets from the vantage point of New Zealand, and Kauanga ("Solitary"), when it was the last star visible before sunrise.

== Future ==
The south celestial pole migrates through Carina.

Carina is in the southern sky quite near the south celestial pole, making circumpolar (never setting) for most of the southern hemisphere. Due to precession of Earth's axis, by the year 4700 the south celestial pole will be in Carina. Three bright stars in Carina will come within 1 degree of the southern celestial pole and take turns as the southern pole star: Omega Carinae (mag 3.29) in 5600, Upsilon Carinae (mag 2.97) in 6700, and Iota Carinae (mag 2.21) in 7900. About 13,860 CE, the bright Canopus (−0.7) will have a greater declination than −82°.

== Namesakes ==
USS Carina (AK-74) was a United States Navy Crater-class cargo ship named after the constellation.

The Toyota Carina was named after it.

== See also ==
- Carina in Chinese astronomy
- Robur Carolinum ("Caroline Oak"), a former constellation formed from part of Carina
- List of brightest stars
