= Outline of astronomy =

Overview of the scientific field of astronomy

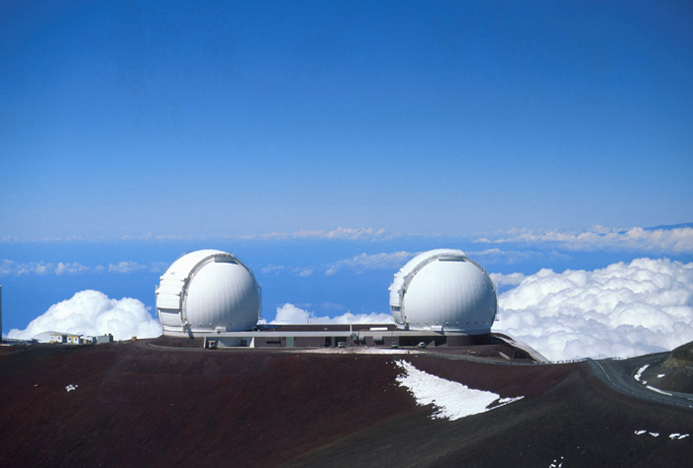
Mauna Kea in Hawaii is one of the world's premier observatory sites. Pictured is the W. M. Keck Observatory, an optical interferometer.

The following outline is provided as an overview of and topical guide to astronomy:

Astronomy – studies the universe beyond Earth, including its formation and development, and the evolution, physics, chemistry, meteorology, and motion of celestial objects (such as galaxies, planets, etc.) and phenomena that originate outside the atmosphere of Earth (such as the cosmic background radiation). Astronomy also intersects with biology, as astrobiology, studying potential life throughout the universe.

== Nature of astronomy ==
Astronomy can be described as all the following:

- An academic discipline: one with academic departments, curricula and degrees; national and international societies; and specialized journals.
- A scientific field (a branch of science) – widely recognized category of specialized expertise within science, and typically embodies it
  - A natural science – one that seeks to elucidate the rules that govern the natural world using empirical and scientific methods.
    - A branch or field of space science
- A hobby or part-time pursuit for the satisfaction of personal curiosity or appreciation of beauty, the latter especially including astrophotography.

== Branches ==
- Astrobiology – studies the advent and evolution of biological systems in the universe.
- Astrophysics (outline) – branch of astronomy that deals with the physics of the universe, including the physical properties of celestial objects, as well as their interactions and behavior. Among the objects studied are galaxies, stars, planets, exoplanets, the interstellar medium and the cosmic microwave background; and the properties examined include luminosity, density, temperature, and chemical composition. The subdisciplines of theoretical astrophysics are:
  - Compact objects – this subdiscipline studies very dense matter in white dwarfs and neutron stars and their effects on environments including accretion.
  - Physical cosmology – origin and evolution of the universe as a whole. The study of cosmology is theoretical astrophysics at its largest scale.
  - Quantum cosmology - the study of cosmology through the use of quantum field theory to explain phenomena general relativity cannot due to limitations in its framework.
  - Computational astrophysics – The study of astrophysics using computational methods and tools to develop computational models.
  - Galactic astronomy – deals with the structure and components of our Galaxy and of other galaxies.
  - High energy astrophysics – studies phenomena occurring at high energies including active galactic nuclei, supernovae, gamma-ray bursts, quasars, and shocks.
  - Interstellar astrophysics – study of the interstellar medium, intergalactic medium and dust.
  - Extragalactic astronomy – study of objects (mainly galaxies) outside our Galaxy, including galaxy formation and evolution.
  - Stellar astronomy – concerned with Star formation, physical properties, main sequence life span, variability, stellar evolution and extinction.
  - Plasma astrophysics – studies properties of plasma in outer space.
  - Relativistic astrophysics – studies effects of special relativity and general relativity in astrophysical contexts including gravitational waves, gravitational lensing and black holes.
  - Solar physics – Sun and its interaction with the remainder of the Solar System and interstellar space.
- Planetary Science – study of planets, moons, and planetary systems.
  - Atmospheric science – study of atmospheres and weather.
  - Exoplanetology – various planets outside of the Solar System
  - Planetary formation – formation of planets and moons in the context of the formation and evolution of the Solar System.
  - Planetary rings – dynamics, stability, and composition of planetary rings
  - Magnetospheres – magnetic fields of planets and moons
  - Planetary surfaces – surface geology of planets and moons
  - Planetary interiors – interior composition of planets and moons
  - Small Solar System bodies – smallest bodies, including asteroids, comets, Kuiper belt objects, and dust.
- Astronomy divided by general technique used for astronomical research:
  - Astrometry – study of the position of objects in the sky and their changes of position. Defines the system of coordinates used and the kinematics of objects in our Galaxy.
  - Observational astronomy – practice of observing celestial objects by using telescopes and other astronomical apparatus. It is concerned with recording data. The subdisciplines of observational astronomy are generally made by the specifications of the detectors, specifically the ranges of wavelengths observed:
    - Radio astronomy – Above 300 μm
    - Submillimetre astronomy – 200 μm to 1 mm
    - Infrared astronomy – 0.7–350 μm
    - Optical astronomy – 380–750 nm
    - Ultraviolet astronomy – 10–320 nm
    - X-ray astronomy – 0.01–10 nm
    - Gamma-ray astronomy – Below 0.01 nm
    - Cosmic ray astronomy – Cosmic rays, including plasma
    - Neutrino astronomy – Neutrinos
    - Dust astronomy – Cosmic dust
    - Gravitational wave astronomy – Gravitons
  - Photometry – study of how bright celestial objects are when passed through different filters
  - Spectroscopy – study of the spectra of astronomical objects
- Other disciplines that may be considered part of astronomy:
  - Archaeoastronomy
  - Astrochemistry

== History ==
History of astronomy

- History of the Center of the Universe
  - Geocentric model
  - Heliocentrism
    - Copernican heliocentrism
    - Tychonic system
- Archaeoastronomy
  - Archaeoastronomy and Vedic chronology
- Pretelescopic astronomy
  - Babylonian astronomy
  - Chinese astronomy
  - Egyptian astronomy
  - Greek astronomy
  - Hebrew astronomy
  - Indian astronomy
  - Islamic astronomy
  - Russian astronomy
  - Astronomy in the Middle Ages
    - Science in Medieval Western Europe
    - Astronomy in medieval Islam
- History of astronomy in the Renaissance
  - Scientific developments during the Scientific Revolution
    - Patronage in astronomy
    - Copernican Revolution
      - Copernican heliocentrism
      - Nicolaus Copernicus
        - On the Revolutions of the Heavenly Spheres
      - Tycho Brahe
        - Tychonic system
      - Galileo Galilei
        - Dialogue Concerning the Two Chief World Systems defense of the heliocentric system written by Galileo, which led to his trial and house arrest by the Inquisition.
    - Invention of the telescope
      - History of visible-light astronomy
- History of astronomy in the Age of Reflection
- Radio astronomy § History of radio astronomy
- History of X-ray astronomy
- History of infrared astronomy
- History of gamma-ray astronomy
- History of supernova observation
  - List of supernovae

== Basic astronomical phenomena ==
- Atmosphere
- Celestial pole
- Eclipse
- Ecliptic
- Cosmic rays
- Kepler's laws
- Doppler effect
- Nutation
- Occultation
- Orbit
- Perturbation
- Precession
- Proper motion
- Redshift
- Solar eclipse
- Tides
- Zodiac

== Astronomical objects ==
Astronomical object

=== Solar System ===

- Solar System
- Geology of solar terrestrial planets
- List of Solar System objects
  - List of Solar System objects by size
- Galilean satellites
- Halley's Comet

==== Sun ====
Sun

- Location
  - Milky Way
    - Solar System
- Stellar classification
  - Stellar classification § Class G
- Internal structure
  - Standard Solar Model
  - Solar core
  - Radiation zone
  - Convection zone
- Stellar atmosphere
  - Photosphere
    - Supergranulation
    - Granule
    - Facula
    - Sunspot
  - Chromosphere
    - Plage
    - Spicule
    - Moreton wave
  - Solar corona
    - Solar transition region
    - Coronal hole
    - Coronal loop
    - Coronal mass ejection
    - Solar prominence
    - Helmet streamer
- Solar variation
  - Solar cycle
    - List of solar cycles
  - Solar maximum
  - Solar minimum
  - Wolf number
  - Solar flare
  - Helioseismology
- Heliosphere
  - Solar wind
    - Heliospheric current sheet
  - Heliosphere § Termination shock
  - Heliosphere § Heliosheath
  - Heliopause
  - Bow shock
- Related phenomena
  - Solar dynamo
  - Solar eclipse
  - Sunlight
  - Solar energy
- Equipment used to study the Sun
  - Solar telescope

==== Planets ====
- Planet
  - Features
    - Natural satellites (moons)
    - Planetary rings
- Planets of the Solar System
  - Mercury
  - Venus
  - Earth
    - Moon
  - Mars
    - Moons of Mars
  - Jupiter
    - Moons of Jupiter
    - Rings of Jupiter
  - Saturn
    - Moons of Saturn
    - Rings of Saturn
  - Uranus
    - Moons of Uranus
    - Rings of Uranus
  - Neptune
    - Moons of Neptune
    - Rings of Neptune
- Dwarf planets of the Solar System
  - Ceres
  - Pluto
    - Moons of Pluto
  - Haumea
    - Moons of Haumea
  - Makemake
  - Eris
    - Dysnomia

==== Small Solar System bodies ====
Small Solar System body

- Asteroids
  - Minor planets
  - Category:Asteroid groups and families
    - Vulcanoid asteroids
    - Near-Earth asteroids
    - Asteroid belt
    - Trojan asteroid
    - Centaur
    - Neptune Trojans
    - Minor planet moons
    - Meteoroids
    - 2 Pallas
    - 3 Juno
    - 4 Vesta
    - 10 Hygiea
  - List of asteroids
  - Meanings of asteroid names
- Trans-Neptunian objects
  - Kuiper belt
    - Plutinos
      - 90482 Orcus
    - Cubewanos
    - 15760 Albion
    - Haumea family
    - 50000 Quaoar
  - Scattered disc
    - 225088 Gonggong
    - 90377 Sedna
  - Comets
  - List of periodic comets
  - List of non-periodic comets
  - Damocloids
  - Hills cloud
  - Oort cloud

=== Exoplanets ===
- Exoplanet (also known as extrasolar planets) – planet outside the Solar System. A total of 4,341 such planets have been identified as of 28 Jan 2021.
  - Super-Earth – exoplanet with a mass higher than Earth's, but substantially below those of the Solar System's ice giants.
  - Mini-Neptune – also known as a gas dwarf or transitional planet. A planet up to 10 Earth masses, but less massive than Uranus and Neptune.
  - Super-Jupiter – an exoplanet more massive than Jupiter.
  - Sub-Earth – an exoplanet "substantially less massive" than Earth and Venus.
  - Circumbinary planet – an exoplanet that orbits two stars.
  - Hot Jupiter – an exoplanet whose characteristics are similar to Jupiter, but that have high surface temperatures because they orbit very close to their parent stars, whereas Jupiter orbits its parent star (the Sun) at 5.2 AU (780×106 km), causing low surface temperatures.
  - Hot Neptune – an exoplanet in an orbit close to its star (normally less than one astronomical unit away), with a mass similar to that of Uranus or Neptune.
  - Pulsar planet – a planet that orbits a pulsar or a rapidly rotating neutron star.
  - Rogue planet (also known as an interstellar planet) – a planetary-mass object that orbits the galaxy directly.

=== Stars and stellar objects ===
- Compact object
- Fixed stars

==== Stars ====
- Stellar evolution
  - Star formation
  - Pre–main sequence
  - Main sequence
  - Horizontal branch
  - Asymptotic giant branch
  - Dredge-up
  - Instability strip
  - Red clump
  - PG 1159 star
  - Mira variable
  - Planetary nebula
  - Protoplanetary nebula
  - Luminous red nova
  - Luminous blue variable
  - Wolf–Rayet star
  - Supernova impostor
  - Supernova
  - Hypernova
  - Hertzsprung–Russell diagram
  - Color–color diagram
- Protostars
  - Molecular cloud
    - H II region
  - Bok globule
  - Young stellar object
  - Herbig–Haro object
  - Hayashi track
  - Hayashi limit
  - Henyey track
  - Orion variable
    - T Tauri star
    - FU Orionis star
  - Herbig Ae/Be
- Luminosity class
  - Subdwarf star
  - Dwarf star
    - Blue dwarf
    - Red dwarf
  - Subgiant
  - Giant star
    - Blue giant
    - Red giant
  - Bright giant
  - Supergiant
    - Blue supergiant
    - Red supergiant
    - Yellow supergiant
  - Hypergiant
    - Yellow hypergiant
  - Blue straggler
- Stellar classification
  - O-type main-sequence star
  - B-type main-sequence star
  - A-type main-sequence star
  - F-type main-sequence star
  - G-type main-sequence star
  - K-type main-sequence star
  - M-type main-sequence star
  - Be star
  - OB star
  - Subdwarf B star
  - Late-type star
  - Peculiar star
    - Am star
    - Ap and Bp stars
      - Rapidly oscillating Ap star
    - Barium star
    - Carbon star
    - CH star
    - Extreme helium star
    - Lambda Boötis star
    - Lead star
    - Mercury-manganese star
    - S-type star
    - Shell star
    - Technetium star
- Remnants
  - White dwarf
    - Black dwarf
    - Helium planet
  - Neutron star
    - Pulsar
    - Magnetar
  - Stellar black hole
  - Compact star
    - Quark star
    - Exotic star
  - Stellar core: EF Eridani
- Failed and theoretical stars
  - Substellar object
    - Brown dwarf
      - Sub-brown dwarf
    - Planetar
  - Boson star
  - Dark star
  - Quasistar
  - Thorne–Żytkow object
  - Iron star
- Stellar nucleosynthesis
  - Alpha process
  - Triple-alpha process
  - Proton–proton chain reaction
  - Helium flash
  - CNO cycle
  - Lithium burning
  - Carbon-burning process
  - Neon-burning process
  - Oxygen-burning process
  - Silicon-burning process
  - S-process
  - R-process
  - Nova
    - Nova remnant
- Stellar structure
  - Solar core
  - Convection zone
    - Microturbulence
    - Solar-like oscillations
  - Radiation zone
  - Photosphere
  - Starspot
  - Chromosphere
  - Stellar corona
  - Stellar wind
    - Stellar-wind bubble
  - Asteroseismology
  - Eddington luminosity
  - Kelvin–Helmholtz mechanism
- Properties
  - Star designation
  - Stellar dynamics
  - Effective temperature
  - Stellar kinematics
  - Stellar magnetic field
  - Magnitude
    - Absolute magnitude
  - Solar mass
  - Metallicity
  - Stellar rotation
  - UBV photometric system
  - Variable star
- Star systems
  - Binary star
    - Contact binary
    - Common envelope
  - Multiple star
  - Accretion disc
  - Planetary system
  - Earth's Solar System
- Earth-centric observation of stars
  - Pole star
  - Circumpolar star
  - Magnitude
    - Apparent magnitude
    - Photographic magnitude
    - color-color diagram
  - Radial velocity
  - Proper motion
  - Parallax § Stellar parallax
  - Photometric-standard star
- Lists of stars
  - List of proper names of stars
  - List of Arabic star names
  - Traditional Chinese star names
  - List of most massive stars
  - List of least massive stars
  - List of largest known stars
  - List of brightest stars
    - Historical brightest stars
  - List of most luminous stars
  - List of nearest stars
    - List of nearest bright stars
  - List of exoplanetary host stars
  - List of brown dwarfs
  - List of planetary nebulae
  - List of novae
  - List of supernovae
  - List of supernova remnants
  - List of supernova candidates
  - Timeline of stellar astronomy

==== Variable stars ====
Variable star

- Pulsating
  - Cepheids and cepheid-like
    - Cepheid variable
    - Type II Cepheids
    - RR Lyrae variable
    - Delta Scuti variable
    - SX Phoenicis variable
  - Blue-white with early spectra
    - Beta Cephei variable
    - PV Telescopii variable
  - Long Period and Semiregular
    - Mira variable
    - Semiregular variable
    - Slow irregular variable
  - Other
    - RV Tauri variable
    - Alpha Cygni variable
    - Pulsating white dwarf
- Eruptive
  - Pre-main sequence star
    - Herbig Ae/Be
    - Orion variable
    - FU Orionis star
  - Main Sequence
    - Wolf-Rayet star
    - Flare star
  - Giants and supergiants
    - Luminous blue variable
    - Gamma Cassiopeiae variable
    - R Coronae Borealis variable
  - Eruptive binary
    - RS Canum Venaticorum variable
  - Cataclysmic or explosive
    - Cataclysmic variable star
    - Dwarf nova
    - Nova
    - Supernova
    - Z Andromedae
- Rotating
  - Non-spherical
    - Ellipsoidal
  - Stellar spots
    - FK Comae Berenices
    - BY Draconis variable
  - Magnetic fields
    - Alpha² Canum Venaticorum variable
    - SX Arietis
    - Pulsar
- Eclipsing binary
  - Algol variable
  - Beta Lyrae variable
  - W Ursae Majoris variable

==== Supernovae ====
Supernova

- Classes
  - Type Ia supernova
  - Type Ib and Ic supernovae
  - Type II (IIP and IIL)
- Related
  - Near-Earth supernova
  - Supernova impostor
  - Hypernova
  - Quark-nova
  - Pulsar kicks
- Structure
  - Pair-instability supernova
  - Supernova nucleosynthesis
  - P-process
  - R-process
  - Gamma-ray burst
  - Carbon detonation
- Progenitors
  - Luminous blue variable
  - Wolf–Rayet star
  - Supergiant
    - Blue supergiant
    - Red supergiant
    - Yellow supergiant
  - Hypergiant
    - Yellow hypergiant
  - White dwarf
- Remnants
  - Supernova remnant
  - Neutron star
    - Pulsar
    - Magnetar
    - Stellar black hole
  - Compact star
  - Supergiant
    - Quark star
    - Exotic star
- Discovery
  - Guest star
  - History of supernova observation
  - Timeline of white dwarfs, neutron stars, and supernovae
- Notable
  - List of supernovae
  - List of supernova remnants
  - List of supernova candidates
  - List of most massive stars
  - Supernovae in fiction
  - SN 1054
  - Supergiant
    - Crab Nebula
  - Tycho's
  - Kepler's
  - SN 1987A
  - SN 185
  - SN 1006
  - SN 2003fg
  - Vela Supernova Remnant
  - Remnant G1.9+0.3
  - SN 2007bi
- Research
  - Supernova Cosmology Project
  - High-z Supernova Search Team
  - Texas Supernova Search
  - Nearby Supernova Factory
  - Supernova Legacy Survey
  - Supernova Early Warning System
  - Monte Agliale Supernovae and Asteroid Survey
  - Supernova/Acceleration Probe
  - Sloan Digital Sky Survey § Sloan Supernova Survey

==== Black holes ====
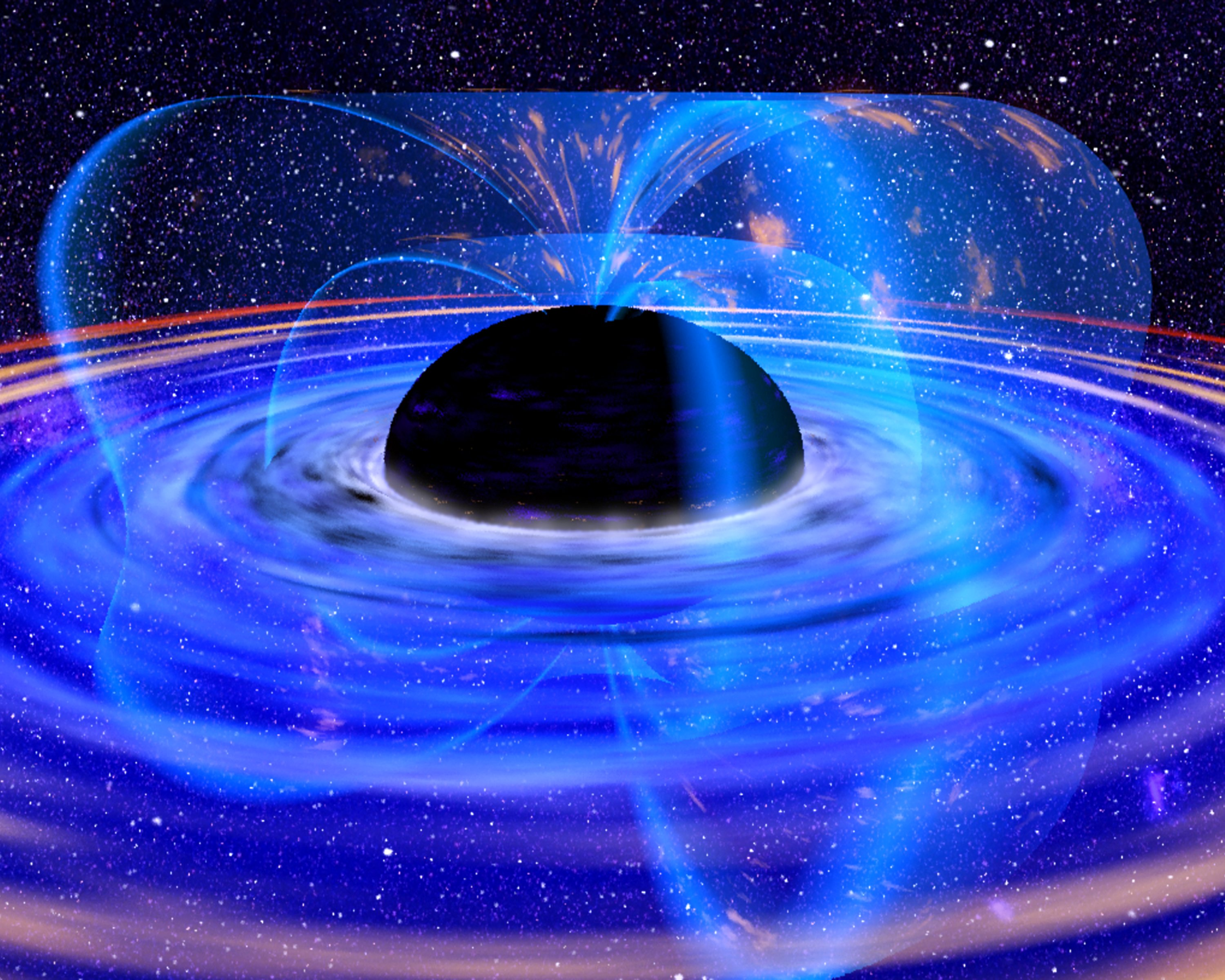
Artist's representation of a black hole.

Black hole

- Types
  - Schwarzschild metric
  - Rotating black hole
  - Charged black hole
  - Virtual black hole
- Size
  - Micro black hole
  - Extremal black hole (Black hole electron)
  - Stellar black hole
  - Intermediate-mass black hole
  - Supermassive black hole
  - Quasar
    - Active galactic nucleus
    - Blazar
- Formation
  - Stellar evolution
  - Gravitational collapse
  - Neutron star (Template:neutron star)
  - Compact star
    - Quark star
    - Exotic star
  - Tolman–Oppenheimer–Volkoff limit
  - White dwarf (Template:white dwarf)
  - Supernova (Template:supernovae)
  - Hypernova
  - Gamma-ray burst
- Properties
  - Black hole thermodynamics
  - Schwarzschild radius
  - M–sigma relation
  - Event horizon
  - Quasi-periodic oscillation
  - Photon sphere
  - Ergosphere
  - Hawking radiation
  - Penrose process
  - Bondi accretion
  - Spaghettification
  - Gravitational lens
- Models
  - Gravitational singularity (Penrose–Hawking singularity theorems)
  - Primordial black hole
  - Gravastar
  - Dark star
  - Dark energy star
  - Black star
  - Magnetospheric eternally collapsing object
  - Fuzzball
  - White hole
  - Naked singularity
  - Ring singularity
  - Immirzi parameter
  - Membrane paradigm
  - Kugelblitz
  - Wormhole
  - Quasistar
- Issues
  - No-hair theorem
  - Black hole information paradox
  - Cosmic censorship hypothesis
  - Nonsingular black hole models
  - Holographic principle
  - Black hole complementarity
- Metrics
  - Schwarzschild metric
  - Kerr metric
  - Reissner–Nordström
  - Kerr–Newman
- Related
  - List of black holes
  - Timeline of black hole physics
  - Rossi X-ray Timing Explorer
  - Hypercompact stellar system

=== Constellations ===
- Constellation
- Constellation family

==== The 88 modern constellations ====
- Andromeda
- Antlia
- Apus
- Aquarius
- Aquila
- Ara
- Aries
- Auriga
- Boötes
- Caelum
- Camelopardalis
- Cancer
- Canes Venatici
- Canis Major
- Canis Minor
- Capricornus
- Carina
- Cassiopeia
- Centaurus
- Cepheus
- Cetus
- Chamaeleon
- Circinus
- Columba
- Coma Berenices
- Corona Australis
- Corona Borealis
- Corvus
- Crater
- Crux
- Cygnus
- Delphinus
- Dorado
- Draco
- Equuleus
- Eridanus
- Fornax
- Gemini
- Grus
- Hercules
- Horologium
- Hydra
- Hydrus
- Indus
- Lacerta
- Leo
- Leo Minor
- Lepus
- Libra
- Lupus
- Lynx
- Lyra
- Mensa
- Microscopium
- Monoceros
- Musca
- Norma
- Octans
- Ophiuchus
- Orion
- Pavo
- Pegasus
- Perseus
- Phoenix
- Pictor
- Pisces
- Piscis Austrinus
- Puppis
- Pyxis
- Reticulum
- Sagitta
- Sagittarius
- Scorpius
- Sculptor
- Scutum
- Serpens
- Sextans
- Taurus
- Telescopium
- Triangulum
- Triangulum Australe
- Tucana
- Ursa Major
- Ursa Minor
- Vela
- Virgo
- Volans
- Vulpecula

==== Constellation history ====
===== The 48 constellations listed by Ptolemy after 150 AD =====
- Andromeda
- Aquarius
- Aquila
- Ara
- Argo Navis
- Aries
- Auriga
- Boötes
- Cancer
- Canis Major
- Canis Minor
- Capricornus
- Cassiopeia
- Centaurus
- Cepheus
- Cetus
- Corona Australis
- Corona Borealis
- Corvus
- Crater
- Cygnus
- Delphinus
- Draco
- Equuleus
- Eridanus
- Gemini
- Hercules
- Hydra
- Leo
- Lepus
- Libra
- Lupus
- Lyra
- Ophiuchus
- Orion
- Pegasus
- Perseus
- Pisces
- Piscis Austrinus
- Sagitta
- Sagittarius
- Scorpius
- Serpens
- Taurus
- Triangulum
- Ursa Major
- Ursa Minor
- Virgo

===== The 41 additional constellations added in the 16th and 17th centuries =====
- Vespucci or Corsalius early 16c: Crux
- Triangulum Australe ▶ Vopel 1536: Coma Berenices ▶ Keyser & de Houtman 1596: Apus
- Chamaeleon
- Dorado
- Grus
- Hydrus
- Indus
- Musca
- Pavo
- Phoenix
- Tucana
- Volans ▶ Plancius 1613: Camelopardalis
- Columba
- Monoceros ▶ Habrecht 1621: Reticulum ▶ Hevelius 1683: Canes Venatici
- Lacerta
- Leo Minor
- Lynx
- Scutum
- Sextans
- Vulpecula ▶ de Lacaille 1763: Antlia
- Caelum
- Carina
- Circinus
- Fornax
- Horologium
- Mensa
- Microscopium
- Norma
- Octans
- Pictor
- Puppis
- Pyxis
- Sculptor
- Telescopium
- Vela

===== Obsolete constellations including Ptolemy's Argo Navis =====
Obsolete constellations including Ptolemy's Argo Navis Anser

- Antinous
- Argo Navis
- Asterion
- Cancer Minor
- Cerberus
- Chara
- Custos Messium
- Felis
- Frederici Honores/Gloria Frederici
- Gallus
- Globus Aerostaticus
- Jordanus
- Lochium Funis
- Machina Electrica
- Malus
- Mons Maenalus
- Musca Borealis
- Noctua
- Officina Typographica
- Polophylax
- Psalterium Georgianum/Harpa Georgii
- Quadrans Muralis
- Ramus Pomifer
- Robur Carolinum
- Sceptrum Brandenburgicum
- Sceptrum et Manus Iustitiae
- Solarium
- Rangifer/Tarandus
- Taurus Poniatovii
- Telescopium Herschelii
- Testudo
- Tigris
- Triangulum Minus
- Turdus Solitarius
- Vespa
- Vultur cadens
- Vultur volans

=== Clusters and nebulae ===
- Interstellar matter
- Nebula
- Crab Nebula
- H I region
- H II region
- Orion Nebula
- Planetary nebula
- Pleiades

=== Galaxies ===
- Galaxy
- Andromeda Galaxy
- Magellanic Clouds
- Quasar

=== Cosmology ===
- Big Bang
- Cosmic microwave background
- Cosmos
- Dark matter
- Cosmic distance ladder
- Hubble constant
- Olbers's paradox
- Universe

=== Space exploration ===
See: Outline of space exploration

== Organizations ==
=== Public sector space agencies ===
Space agencies

==== Africa ====
===== North Africa =====
- (Algeria) Algerian Space Agency
- (Egypt) National Authority for Remote Sensing and Space Sciences
- Egypt Remote Sensing Center
- (Morocco) Royal Centre for Remote Sensing
- (Tunisia) National Remote Sensing Center

===== Sub-Saharan =====
- (Nigeria) National Space Research and Development Agency
- (South Africa) South African National Space Agency

==== North America ====
- (Mexico) Agencia Espacial Mexicana
- (Canada) Canadian Space Agency
- (United States) NASA
- United States Department of Defense
  - National Reconnaissance Office
  - United States Army Space and Missile Defense Command
  - United States Space Command
  - United States Space Force

==== South America ====
- (Venezuela) Agencia Bolivariana para Actividades Espaciales
- (Brazil) Brazilian Space Agency
- (Brazil) Brazilian General Command for Aerospace Technology
- (Colombia) Colombian Space Commission
- (Argentina) Comisión Nacional de Actividades Espaciales
- (Peru) Comisión Nacional de Investigación y Desarrollo Aeroespacial
- (Brazil) Instituto Tecnológico de Aeronáutica
- (Venezuela) Instituto Venezolano de Investigaciones Científicas
- (Brazil) National Institute for Space Research

==== Asia ====
===== East Asia =====
- China Aerospace Science and Technology Corporation (China Academy of Launch Vehicle Technology
- China Academy of Space Technology
- China Chang Feng
- China Aerospace Science and Technology Corporation
- Commission for Science, Technology and Industry for National Defense)
- China National Space Administration
- Japan Aerospace Exploration Agency (Institute of Space and Astronautical Science
- National Aerospace Laboratory of Japan
- National Space Development Agency of Japan)
- National Institute of Information and Communications Technology
- Institute for Unmanned Space Experiment Free Flyer
- (Mongolia) National Remote Sensing Center
- (North Korea) Korean Committee of Space Technology
- (South Korea) Korea Aerospace Research Institute
- (Taiwan) National Space Organization

===== Southeast Asia =====
- (Indonesia) National Institute of Aeronautics and Space
- (Malaysia) Malaysian Space Agency
- (Philippines) Philippine Atmospheric, Geophysical and Astronomical Services Administration
- (Thailand) Thai Ministry of Science and Technology's Space Agency
- (Vietnam) Space Technology Institute
- Vietnam Space Commission

===== South Asia =====
- (Bangladesh) Space Research and Remote Sensing Organization
- Department of Space
  - Antrix Corporation
  - Indian Institute of Space Science and Technology
  - Indian Space Research Organisation
  - National Atmospheric Research Laboratory
  - New Space India Limited
  - North-Eastern Space Applications Centre
  - Physical Research Laboratory
  - Semi-Conductor Laboratory
- (Pakistan) Space and Upper Atmosphere Research Commission

===== Southwest Asia =====
- Azerbaijan National Aerospace Agency^{1}
- Iran Aviation Industries Organization
- Iranian Space Agency
- Israel Space Agency
- National Committee for Space Research
- (Turkey) TÜBİTAK UZAY

===== Central Asia =====
- (Kazakhstan) KazCosmos
- Kazakh Space Research Institute^{1}
- Turkmenistan National Space Agency^{1}
- (Uzbekistan) Uzcosmos

==== Europe ====
- (Austria) Austrian Space Agency
- Belarus Space Agency^{1}
- (Belgium) Belgian Institute for Space Aeronomy
- (Bulgaria) Bulgarian Space Agency
- (Czech Republic) Czech Space Office
- (Denmark) Danish National Space Center
- esa European Cooperation for Space Standardization
- European Space Agency
- (European Union) EUMETSAT
- European Union Satellite Centre
- (France) CNES
- (Germany) German Aerospace Center
- (Greece) Institute for Space Applications and Remote Sensing
- (Hungary) Hungarian Space Office
- (Republic of Ireland) Space Ireland
- (Italy) Italian Space Agency
- (Lithuania) Space Science and Technology Institute^{1}
- (Luxembourg) Luxinnovation
- Netherlands Institute for Space Research
- (Norway) Norwegian Space Centre
- (Poland) Space Research Centre
- (Portugal) Portuguese Space Company
- (Romania) Romanian Space Agency
- (Russia) Russian Federal Space Agency^{1}
- Russian Space Research Institute^{1}
- Russian Space Forces
- (Soviet Union) Soviet space program
- (Spain) Instituto Nacional de Técnica Aeroespacial
- (Sweden) Swedish National Space Board
- (Switzerland) Swiss Space Office
- (United Kingdom) UK Space Agency
- (Ukraine) State Space Agency of Ukraine^{1}

==== Oceania ====
- (Australia) Commonwealth Scientific and Industrial Research Organisation

==== World ====
- Asia-Pacific Space Cooperation Organization
- Consultative Committee for Space Data Systems
- Committee on Space Research
- International Academy of Astronautics
- International Telecommunications Satellite Organization
- Intercosmos
- Intersputnik
- (Arab League) Pan-Arab Space Agency
- United Nations
  - United Nations Committee on the Peaceful Uses of Outer Space
  - United Nations Office for Outer Space Affairs

^{1} Preceded by the Soviet space program

=== Books and publications ===
- Almagest
- Astronomia Nova
- Astronomical Journal
- Astrophysical Journal
- BD Catalogue
- De Revolutionibus
- Henry Draper Catalogue
- Messier Catalogue
- New General Catalogue
- Principia

== Astronomers ==
- Aryabhata
- Walter Baade
- Friedrich Bessel
- Tycho Brahe
- Annie Jump Cannon
- Alvan Clark
- Nicholas Copernicus
- Galileo Galilei
- George Ellery Hale
- William Herschel
- Edwin Hubble
- Jacobus Kapteyn
- Johannes Kepler
- Gerard Kuiper
- Joseph-Louis Lagrange
- Pierre-Simon Laplace
- Henrietta Leavitt
- Isaac Newton
- Edward C. Pickering
- Ptolemy
- Henry Norris Russell
- Harlow Shapley

== See also ==
- Asterism
- Constellation
- Galaxy
- Globular cluster
- Gravitation
- Guest star
- Helioseismology
- Infrared dark cloud
- Intergalactic star
- Open cluster
- Planet
- Star cluster
- Stellar association
- Supercluster
