= ANote Music =

Luxembourg-based Financial technology company

- Company type: Private
- Industry: Financial technology, Music industry
- Founded: July 30, 2018
- Founder: Marzio Schena, Matteo Cernuschi, Grégoire Mathonet
- Headquarters: Luxembourg City, Luxembourg
- Key people: Marzio Flavio Schena (CEO); Matteo Cernuschi (COO); Grégoire Mathonet (CTO)
- Website: www.anotemusic.com

ANote S.A., doing business as ANote Music, is a Luxembourg-based financial technology company that operates an online marketplace for music royalties investments. The platform allows rights holders — such as record labels, publishers, and artists — to list future royalty streams, which investors can purchase as shares. These shares entitle holders to receive a portion of the underlying royalty income.

Founded in 2018, ANote Music launched to the public in 2020. Since then, the company has facilitated over €10 million in royalty-related transactions and has distributed more than €1 million in royalties to investors. Its business model aims to offer greater liquidity and transparency in the monetization of music rights.

== History ==
ANote Music was founded on 30 July 2018 by Marzio Schena, Matteo Cernuschi, and Grégoire Mathonet. The company was accepted into the "Fit 4 Start" accelerator program in 2019, a joint initiative by Luxinnovation and the Luxembourg Ministry of the Economy.

In January 2020, ANote Music raised €505,000 in funding from music industry professionals and European investors to further develop its platform. The platform officially launched on 28 July 2020, listing its first catalogue from Italian label Irma Records.

In October 2021, the company appointed Mathew Knowles, a music executive and father of Beyoncé and Solange, and Carlo Antonelli, a former editor-in-chief of Rolling Stone Italia, as senior advisers. This coincided with a bridge funding round bringing total investment to over €1.5 million.

In August 2022, co-founders Schena and Cernuschi were featured in Forbes Italy's 30 Under 30 in the Music category. That same year, the company was a finalist at the Startup World Cup in Las Vegas, having won the regional selection in Luxembourg.

In 2023, ANote Music expanded its offerings to institutional investors, introducing music-backed financial products with a €125,000 minimum threshold. The launch was supported by €500,000 in new funding from Algorand Ventures, ACME Innovation, and the Young Innovative Enterprise Grant by Luxinnovation.

On 30 October 2024, the company reported over €1 million in distributed royalties and more than €10 million in total transactions, €6.7 million of which took place via the secondary market.

== See also ==
- Royalty Exchange
- Celebrity bond
- Music royalties
