= 54 Eridani =

Star in the constellation Eridanus

- Location of 54 Eridani (circled in red)

Observation data Epoch J2000 Equinox ICRS
- Constellation: Eridanus
- Right ascension: 04^{h} 40^{m} 26.51159^{s}
- Declination: −19° 40′ 17.3723″
- Apparent magnitude (V): 4.32

Characteristics
- Evolutionary stage: asymptotic giant branch
- Spectral type: M3/4 III
- U−B color index: +1.80
- B−V color index: 1.599±0.021
- Variable type: SRb

Astrometry
Radial velocity (R_{v})	−32.9±0.8 km/s
Proper motion (μ)	RA: +29.13 mas/yr Dec.: −96.42 mas/yr
Parallax (π)	8.2063±0.2709 mas
Distance	400 ± 10 ly (122 ± 4 pc)
Absolute magnitude (M_{V})	−0.93

Details
Mass	3.95 M_{☉}
Radius	69+12 −6 R_{☉}
Luminosity	2,239 L_{☉}
Surface gravity (log g)	1.98 cgs
Temperature	3,500 K
Metallicity [Fe/H]	0.00 dex

Other designations
- DM Eridani, BD−19°988, GC 5695, HD 29755, HIP 21763, HR 1496, SAO 149818, WDS J04404-1940

Database references
SIMBAD	data

54 Eridani is a suspected astrometric binary star system located around 400 light years from the Sun in the barely equatorial-southern constellation of Eridanus. It is visible to the naked eye as a faint, reddish hued star with a baseline apparent visual magnitude of 4.32. The object is moving closer to the Earth with a heliocentric radial velocity of −33 km/s.

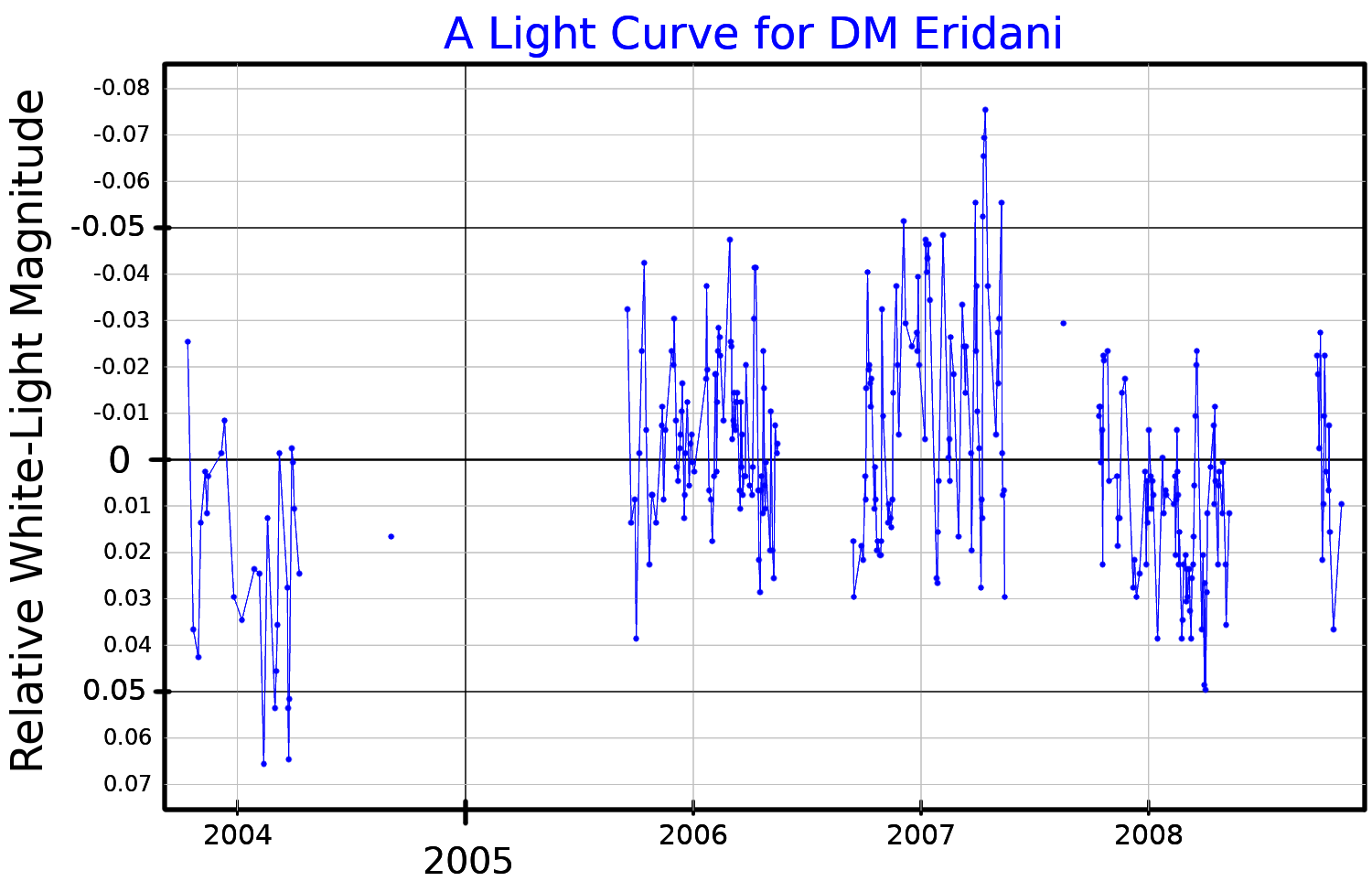
A light curve for DM Eridani, plotted from data published by Tabur et al. (2009)

The variability of 54 Eridani was announced by Benjamin Apthorp Gould in his Uranometria Argentina, published in 1879. But it was not given its variable star designation, DM Eridani, until nearly 100 years later, in 1973. The visible component is an aging red giant star, currently on the asymptotic giant branch, with a stellar classification of M3/4 III. It is a semiregular variable star of subtype SRb, ranging in magnitude from 4.28 down to 4.36. The star has pulsation periods of 18.8 and 45.5 days, each with an amplitude of 0.019 in magnitude. With the hydrogen and helium at its core exhausted, the star has expanded to around 69 times the Sun's radius and it is radiating 1,021 times the luminosity of the Sun from its swollen photosphere at an effective temperature of 3,915 K.

It was the second-brightest star in the obsolete constellation of Sceptrum Brandenburgicum after 53 Eridani.
