= Colombian Space Commission =

Colombian space agency

- Comisión Colombiana del Espacio

Agency overview
- Formed: July 18, 2006; 20 years ago

The Colombian Space Commission (CSC; Spanish: Comisión Colombiana del Espacio) is Colombia’s government body for the promotion and use of space. It is in charge of promoting the development of space technology and communication satellites as well as applications for the navigation and maritime transportation in Colombia. It also works in the observation and surveillance of the country's natural resources. It was created by presidential decree No. 2442 in July 2006. although there have been some Americans of Colombian descent who have gone into space such as George D. Zamka.

== Colombian artificial satellites ==
1. Libertad I, 2007
2. FACSAT-1, 2018

== See also ==
- List of government space agencies
