= Near-Earth supernova =

Supernova close enough to affect Earth's biosphere

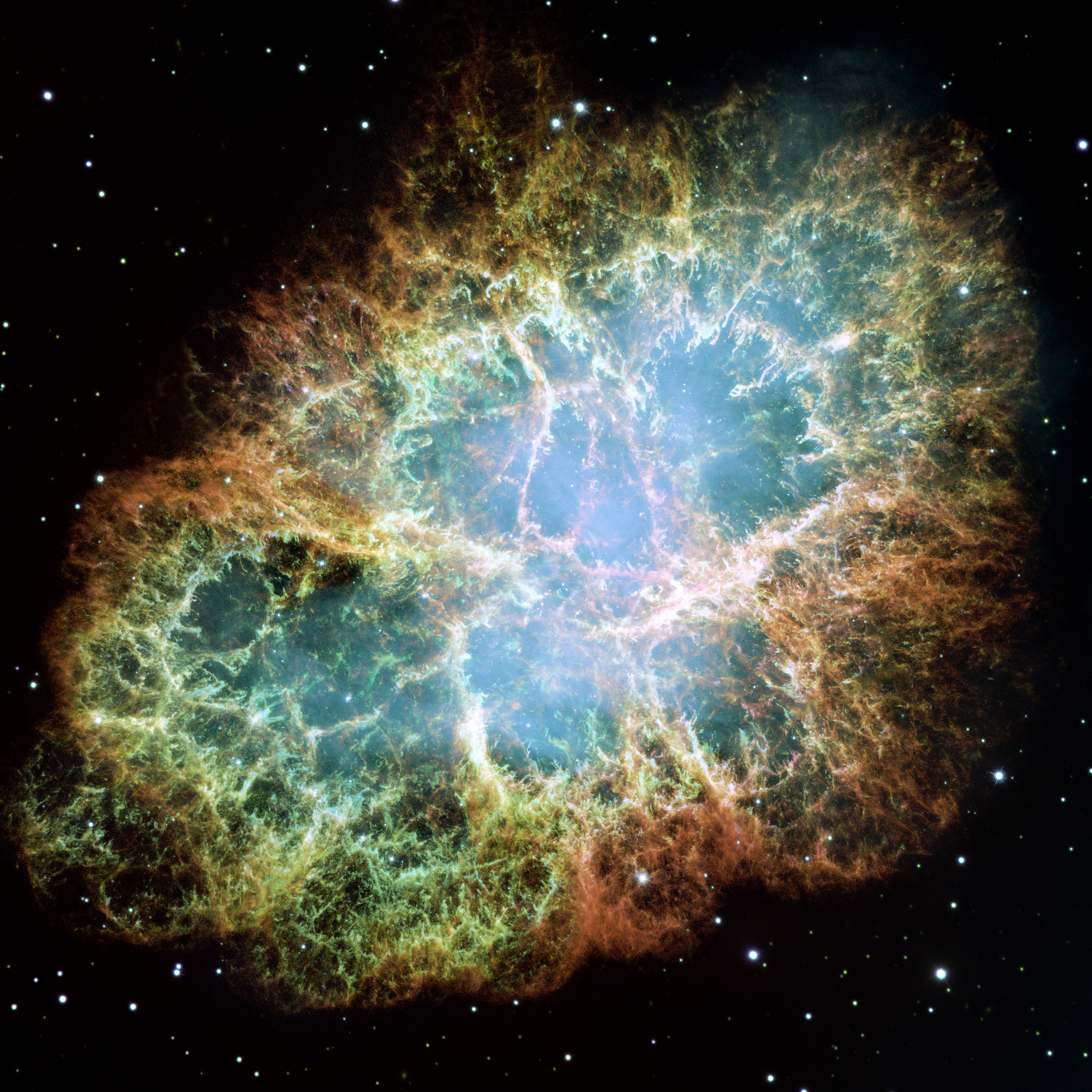
The Crab Nebula is a pulsar wind nebula associated with the 1054 supernova. It is located about 6,500 light-years from the Earth.

A near-Earth supernova is an explosion resulting from the death of a star that occurs close enough to the Earth, less than roughly 10 to 300 parsecs [33 to 978 light-years] away, to have noticeable effects on its biosphere.

An estimated 20 supernova explosions have happened within 300 pc of the Earth over the last 300 thousand years. Type II supernova explosions are expected to occur in active star-forming regions, with 12 such OB associations being located within 650 pc of the Earth. At present, there are up to 14 near-Earth supernova candidates within 300 pc.

== Effects on Earth ==
Estimates for the rate of supernova explosions are highly uncertain. An example is that on average, one supernova explosion occurs within 10 parsecs (33 light-years) of the Earth every 240 million years. Gamma rays are responsible for most of the adverse effects that a supernova may have on a life-harboring terrestrial planet. In Earth's case, gamma rays induce radiolysis of diatomic N_{2} and O_{2} in the upper atmosphere, converting molecular nitrogen and oxygen into nitrogen oxides, and thereby notably depleting the ozone layer, enough to expose the surface to bio-harmful (mainly ultra-violet) solar and cosmic radiation. Phytoplankton and reef communities would be particularly affected, which could severely deplete the base of the marine food chain.

Historically, nearby supernovae may have influenced the biodiversity of life on the planet. Geological records suggest that nearby supernova events have led to an increase in cosmic rays, which in turn produced a cooler climate. A greater temperature difference between the poles and the equator created stronger winds, increased ocean mixing, and resulted in the transport of nutrients to shallow waters along the continental shelves. This led to greater biodiversity.

Odenwald discusses the possible effects of a Betelgeuse supernova on the Earth and on human space travel, especially the effects of the stream of charged particles that would reach the Earth about 100,000 years later than the initial light and other electromagnetic radiation produced by the explosion. However, it is estimated that it may take up to 1.5 million years for Betelgeuse to undergo a supernova.

== Risk by supernova type ==
Candidates within 300 pc
Star designation	Distance (pc)	Mass (M_{☉})	Evolutionary stage
IK Pegasi	46	1.65/1.15	White dwarf
Nunki	70	6.5/6.3	Main sequence via stellar merger
Spica	80	10.25/7.0	Blue subgiant
Acrux	99	17.8	Main sequence
Alpha^{2} Crucis	99	15.52	Main sequence
Zeta Ophiuchi	112	20	Main sequence
Uridim	141	10.1	Blue giant
Betelgeuse	125–168.1	14–19	Red supergiant
Antares	169	12.4/10	Red supergiant
Ahadi	250	11.7 ± 0.2	Red supergiant
Rigel	264	18	Blue supergiant
S Monocerotis A	282	29.1	Main sequence
S Monocerotis B	282	21.3	Main sequence

Speculation as to the effects of a nearby supernova on Earth often focuses on large stars as Type II supernova candidates. Several prominent stars within a few hundred light years of the Sun are candidates for becoming supernovae in as little as 1,000 years. Although they would be extremely visible, if these "predictable" supernovae were to occur, they are thought to pose little threat to Earth.

It is estimated that a Type II supernova closer than eight parsecs (26 light-years) would destroy more than half of the Earth's ozone layer. Such estimates are based on atmospheric modeling and the measured radiation flux from SN 1987A, a Type II supernova in the Large Magellanic Cloud. Estimates of the rate of supernova occurrence within 10 parsecs of the Earth vary from 0.05–0.5 per billion years to 10 per billion years. Several studies assume that supernovae are concentrated in the spiral arms of the galaxy, and that supernova explosions near the Sun usually occur during the approximately 10 million years that the Sun takes to pass through one of these regions. Examples of relatively near supernovae are the Vela Supernova Remnant (c. 800 ly, c. 12,000 years ago) and Geminga (c. 550 ly, c. 300,000 years ago).

Type Ia supernovae are thought to be potentially the most dangerous if they occur close enough to the Earth. Because Type Ia supernovae arise from dim, common white dwarf stars, it is likely that a supernova that could affect the Earth will occur unpredictably and take place in a star system that is not well studied. The closest known candidate is IK Pegasi. It is currently estimated, however, that by the time it could become a threat, its velocity in relation to the Solar System would have carried IK Pegasi to a safe distance.

== Past events ==
Evidence from daughter products of short-lived radioactive isotopes shows that a nearby supernova helped determine the composition of the Solar System 4.5 billion years ago, and may even have triggered the formation of this system. Supernova production of heavy elements over astronomic periods of time ultimately made the chemistry of life on Earth possible.

Past supernovae might be detectable on Earth in the form of metal isotope signatures in rock strata. Subsequently, iron-60 enrichment has been reported in deep-sea rock of the Pacific Ocean by researchers from the Technical University of Munich. Twenty-three atoms of this iron isotope were found in the top 2 cm of crust (this layer corresponds to times from 13.4 million years ago to the present). It is estimated that the supernova must have occurred in the last 5 million years or else it would have had to happen very close to the solar system to account for so much iron-60 still being here. A supernova occurring so close would have probably caused a mass extinction, which did not happen in that time frame. The quantity of iron seems to indicate that the supernova was less than 30 parsecs away. On the other hand, the authors estimate the frequency of supernovae at a distance less than D (for reasonably small D) as around (D/10 pc)^{3} per billion years, which gives a probability of only around 5% for a supernova within 30 pc in the last 5 million years. They point out that the probability may be higher because the Solar System is entering the Orion Arm of the Milky Way. In 2019, the group in Munich found interstellar dust in Antarctic surface snow not older than 20 years which they relate to the Local Interstellar Cloud. The detection of interstellar dust in Antarctica was done by the measurement of the radionuclides Fe-60 and Mn-53 by highly sensitive accelerator mass spectrometry, where Fe-60 is again the clear signature for a recent near-Earth supernova origin.

Gamma ray bursts from "dangerously close" supernova explosions occur two or more times per billion years, and this has been proposed as the cause of the end-Ordovician extinction, which resulted in the death of nearly 60% of the oceanic life on Earth. Multiple supernovae in a cluster of dying hypergiant stars that occurred in rapid succession on an astronomical and geological timescale have also been proposed as a trigger for the multiple pulses of the Late Devonian extinction, in particular the Hangenberg event at the terminus of the Devonian.

In 1998 a supernova remnant, RX J0852.0−4622, was found in front (apparently) of the larger Vela Supernova Remnant. Gamma rays from the decay of titanium-44 (half-life about 60 years) were independently discovered emanating from it, showing that it must have exploded fairly recently (perhaps around the year 1200), but there is no historical record of it. Its distance is controversial, but some scientists argue from the flux of gamma rays and X-rays that the supernova remnant is only 200 parsecs (650–700 light-years) away. If so, its occurring 800 years ago is a statistically unexpected event because supernovae less than 200 parsecs away are estimated to occur less than once per 100,000 years.

== See also ==
- List of supernova candidates
