= List of stars in Argo Navis =

The historical constellation Argo Navis is split into three modern constellations, Carina, Puppis, and Vela. For lists of stars in these constellations, see:

- List of stars in Carina
- List of stars in Puppis
- List of stars in Vela

== See also ==
- Lists of stars by constellation
