= NGC 2736 =

Supernova remnant in the constellation Vela

Nebula
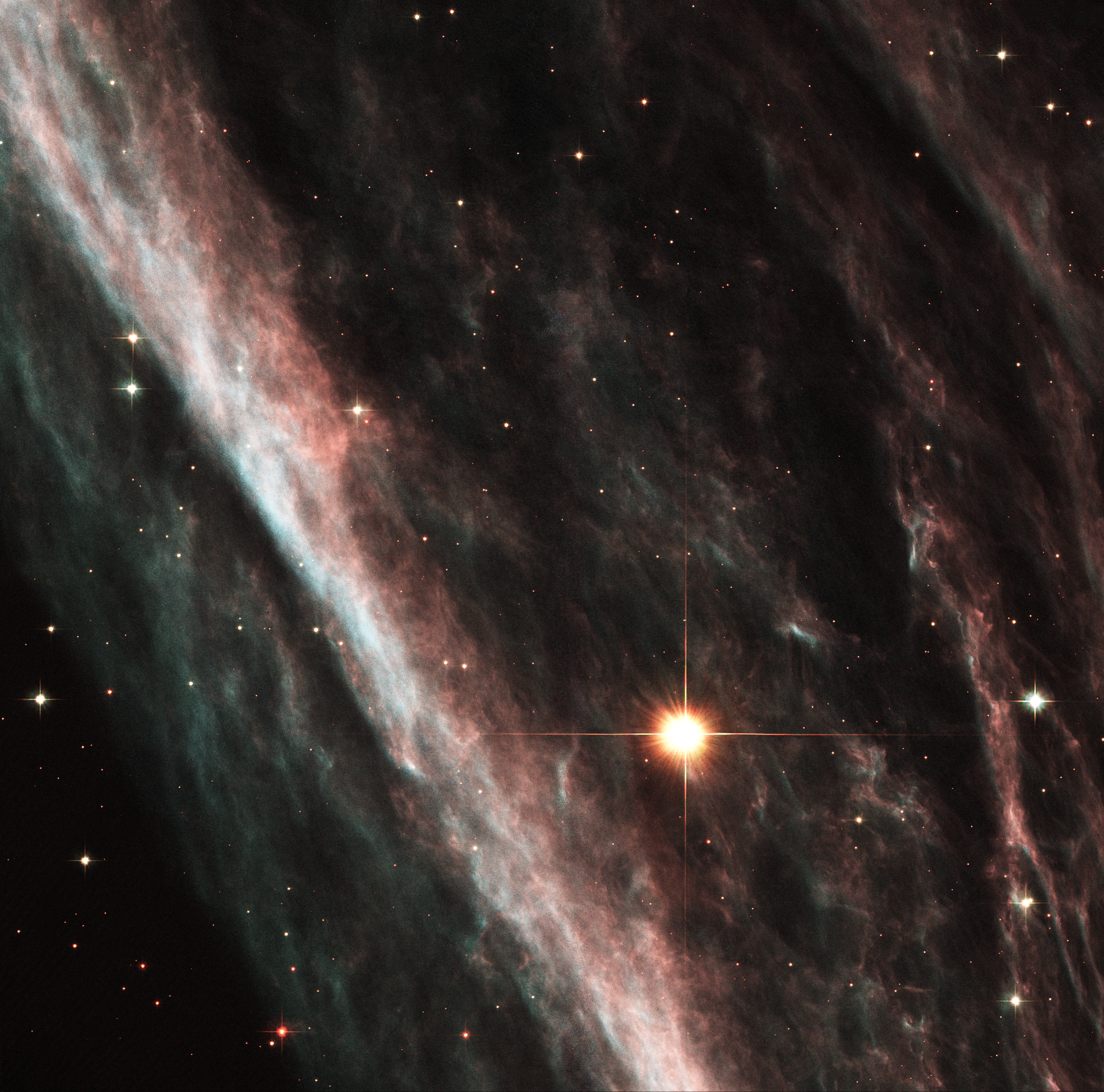
- Hubble Space Telescope image of NGC 2736

Observation data: J2000 epoch
- Right ascension: 9^{h} 0^{m} 17^{s}
- Declination: −45° 54′ 57″
- Distance: 815 ly
- Apparent magnitude (V): +12.0?
- Apparent dimensions (V): 30'x7'
- Constellation: Vela

Physical characteristics
- Radius: ~5.0 ly
- Designations: NGC 2736, Pencil Nebula

NGC 2736 (also known as the Pencil Nebula) is a small part of the Vela Supernova Remnant, located near the Vela Pulsar in the constellation Vela. The nebula's linear appearance triggered its popular name. It resides about 815 light-years (250 parsecs) away from the Solar System. It is thought to be formed from part of the shock wave of the larger Vela Supernova Remnant. The Pencil Nebula is moving at roughly 644,000 kilometres per hour (400,000 miles per hour)

== History ==
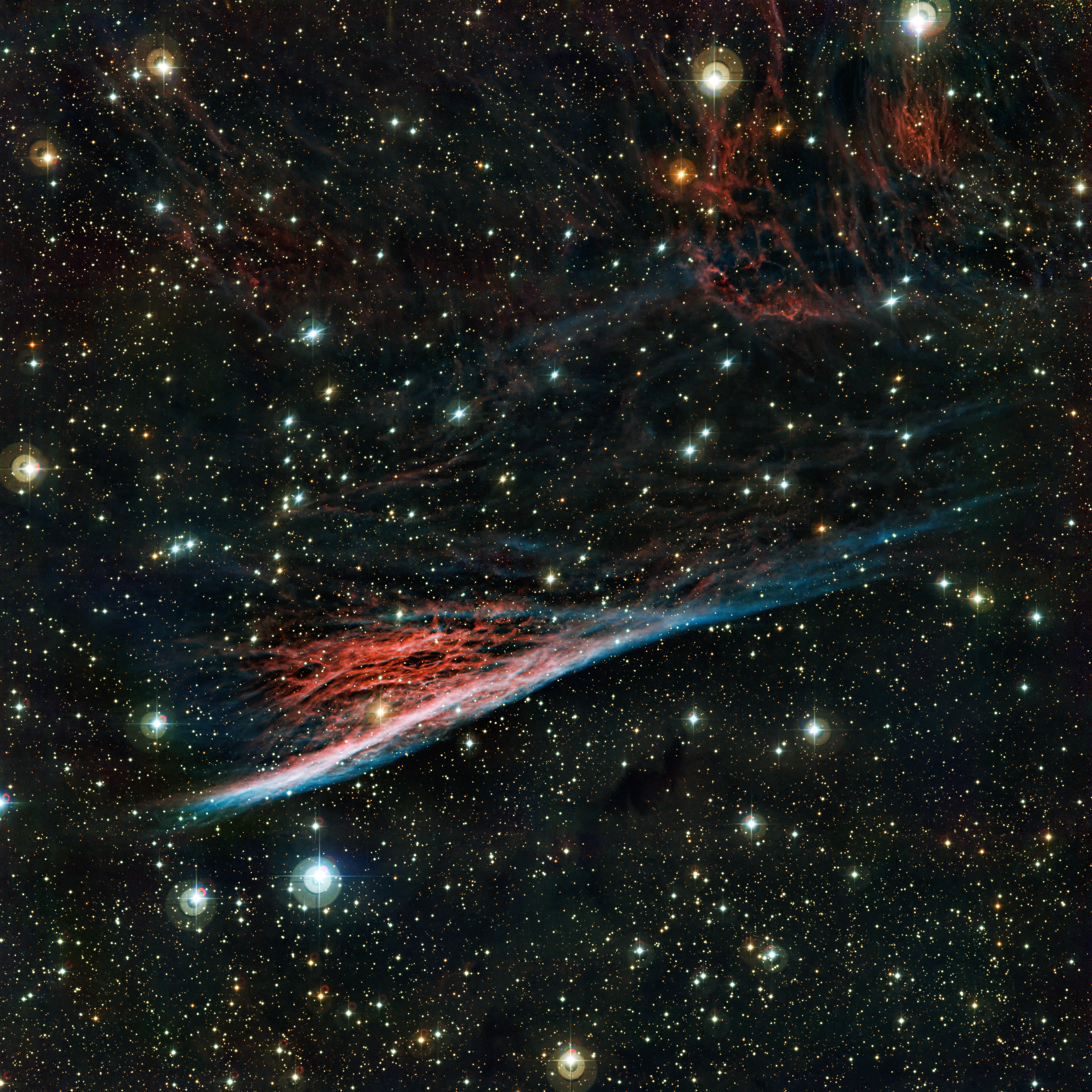
NGC 2736 is a small part of the huge Vela Supernova Remnant left over after a supernova explosion that took place about 11 000 years ago.

On 1 March 1835, John Herschel discovered this object at the Cape of Good Hope and described it as "eeF, L, vvmE; an extraordinary long narrow ray of excessively feeble light; position 19 ±. At least 20' long, extending much beyond the limits of the field...". This agrees perfectly with the ESO- Uppsala listing N2736 = E260-N14, a nebula with dimensions 30'x7', position angle of 20 and notes "Luminous filament". Harold Corwin adds that on the ESO IIIa-F film this nebula is the brightest patch of a huge supernova remnant (Gum Nebula) whose delicate whisps cover the field. A relatively bright star is immersed in N2736 (mentioned by Herschel).

== See also ==
- List of photographs considered the most important
