= Sceptrum Brandenburgicum =

Former constellation

Sceptrum Brandenburgicum (or Sceptrum Brandenburgium – Latin for scepter of Brandenburg) was a constellation created in 1688 by Gottfried Kirch, astronomer of the Prussian Royal Society of Sciences. It represented the scepter used by the royal family of the Brandenburgs. It was west from the constellation of Lepus. The constellation was quickly forgotten and is no longer in use. Its name was, however, partially inherited by one of its brightest stars, Sceptrum, which today is denoted 53 Eridani. This name is still in use today.

== Stars ==
Apart from 53 Eridani, the constellation still had other bright stars, like 54 Eridani, 46 Eridani, 47 Eridani, and HR 1483. Bode gave them Bayer designations as well. Here is a table of the corresponding stars.

Name	B
HD 28979	e
60 Eri	f
46 Eri	m
47 Eri	n
HD 29573	o
53 Eri	p
HD 30238	q
54 Eri	r
58 Eri	z

== See also ==
- Former constellations
