= RX J0852.0−4622 =

Relatively young and nearby supernova remnant

RX J0852.0−4622 or Vela Junior
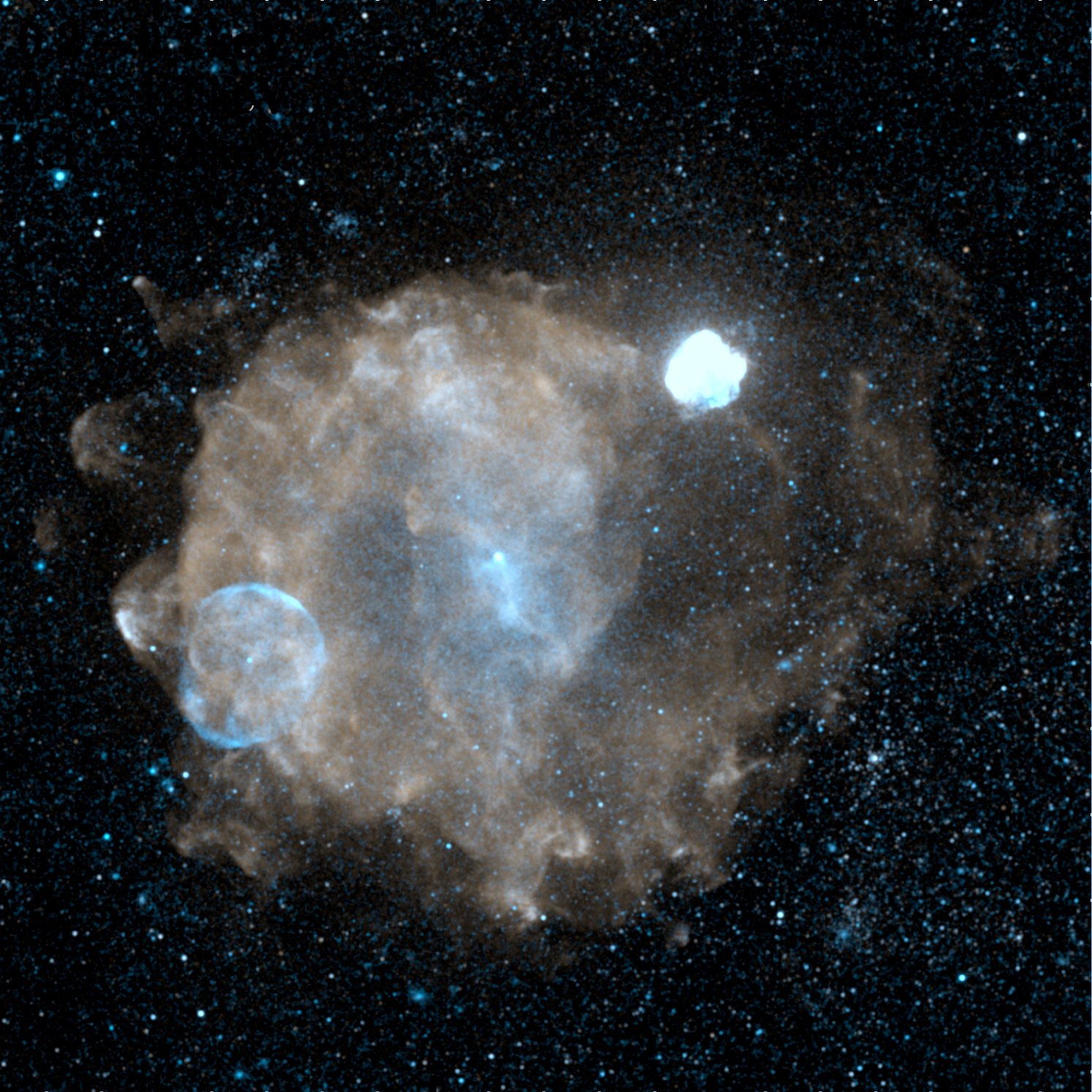
- X-ray emission from the extended Vela SNR captured by the satellite eROSITA: Vela Jr. is visible on the lower left turquoise, nearly as circle – similar to a soap bubble; in the centerpoint the neutron star CXOU J085201.4-461753 and a third SNR Puppis A could be seen top right as a white cloud.
- Event type: Supernova remnant
- SN
- Date: 1998
- Constellation: Vela
- Right ascension: 08^{h} 52^{m}
- Declination: −46° 22′
- Epoch: J2000.0
- Galactic coordinates: 286.9460 +42.4568 (34" W, 10" S)
- Distance: >1500 ly
- Remnant: CXOU J085201.4-461753
- Notable features: central object in SNR RX J0852.0−4622 = AX J0851.9−4617.
- Other designations: SNR G266.2-01.2, SNR G266.3-01.2, 3FHL J0851.9-4620e, RX J0852.0-4622, 2FGL J0851.7-4635, 3FGL J0852.7-4631e, 2FHL J0852.8-4631, 2FHL J0852.8-4631e
- Related media on Commons

RX J0852.0−4622 (also known as G266.2−1.2) is a supernova remnant. The remnant is located in the southern sky in the constellation Vela ("sail"), and sits (in projection) inside the much larger and older Vela Supernova Remnant. For this reason, RX J0852.0−4622 is often referred to as Vela Junior (Vela Jr.). There have been a minority of suggestions that the remnant may be a spurious identification of a complicated substructure within the larger and better studied Vela SNR, but most studies accept that G266.2−1.2 is a SNR in its own right. Indeed, its detection in the high energy Teraelectronvolt range by the High Energy Stereoscopic System in 2005 is strong confirmation of such.

It was found in 1998 with an analysis of data from the ROSAT x-ray telescope. Published simultaneously with its discovery was a claimed detection by the Compton Gamma Ray Observatory of a gamma ray spectral line of ^{44}Ti which has a half-life of 60 years and therefore seemed to indicate a young provenance for the supernova, perhaps the youngest one yet discovered. Later independent groups could not reproduce the detection, and so the consensus is that the identification of this line was likely spurious. Since the age and distance are correlated, a young, nearby supernova like this has inspired some detective work to identify evidence that such a supernova may have been observed and recorded by groups of people, and geochronologists have looked for evidence of a young supernova in tree ring and ice core data, but identification of claimed correlate signals have not been conclusively made. The latest analyses of the remnant indicate an age of at least 2400 years (and possibly much older), a distance of no less than 500 parsecs, and a radial size of at least 8 parsecs.

The central compact object (CCO) was discovered in 2001. In the initial Chandra X-ray image and deeper images thereafter, no pulsations were detected from the compact remnant, which is believed to be the neutron star CXOU J085201.4-461753. A different pulsar was suggested as the remnant, but its kinematics do not conform as well to the observed kinematics of the remnant shell.

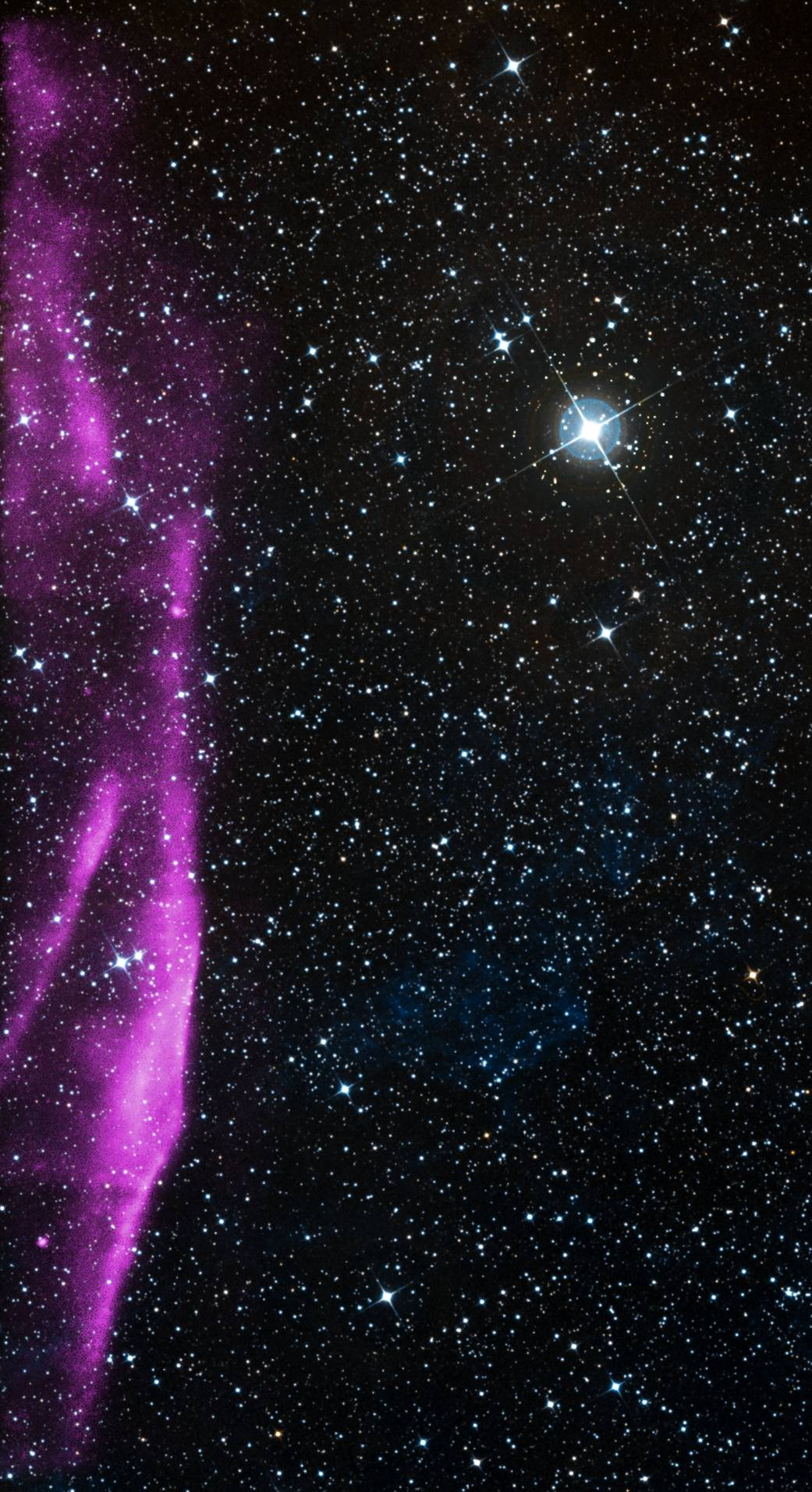
The purple in this image is a false color indication of the x-rays detected by the Chandra X-Ray Observatory emanating from the edge of the supernova remnant due to a shockwave front. The center of the remnant is out of frame, off to the left.
