= Malus (constellation) =

Former constellation

Malus (Latin for mast) was a subdivision of the ancient constellation Argo Navis proposed in 1844 by the English astronomer John Herschel. It would have replaced Pyxis, the compass, which was introduced in the 1750s by Nicolas Louis de Lacaille. Herschel's suggestion was not widely adopted and Malus is not now recognized by astronomers.

== See also ==
- Argo Navis
- Former constellations
