= Robur Carolinum =

Astronomical constellation

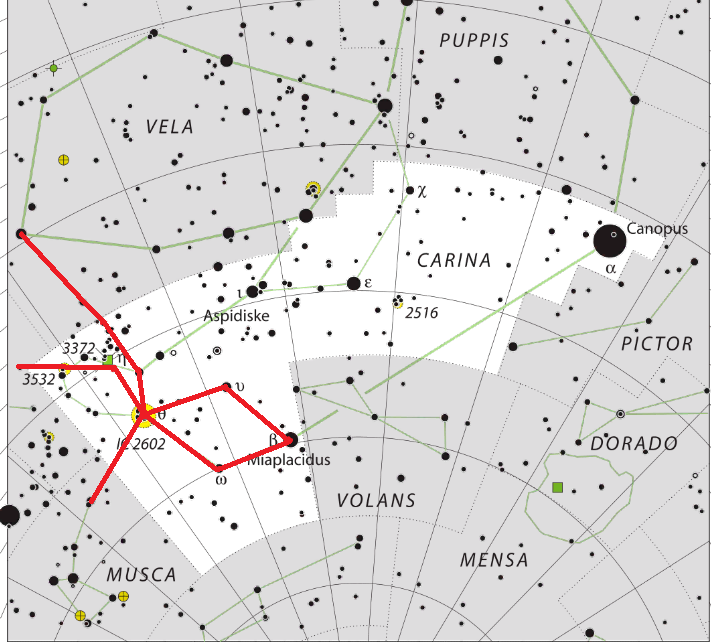
Robur Carolinum (red) is now divided between Carina and Vela, parts of the former constellation Argo Navis

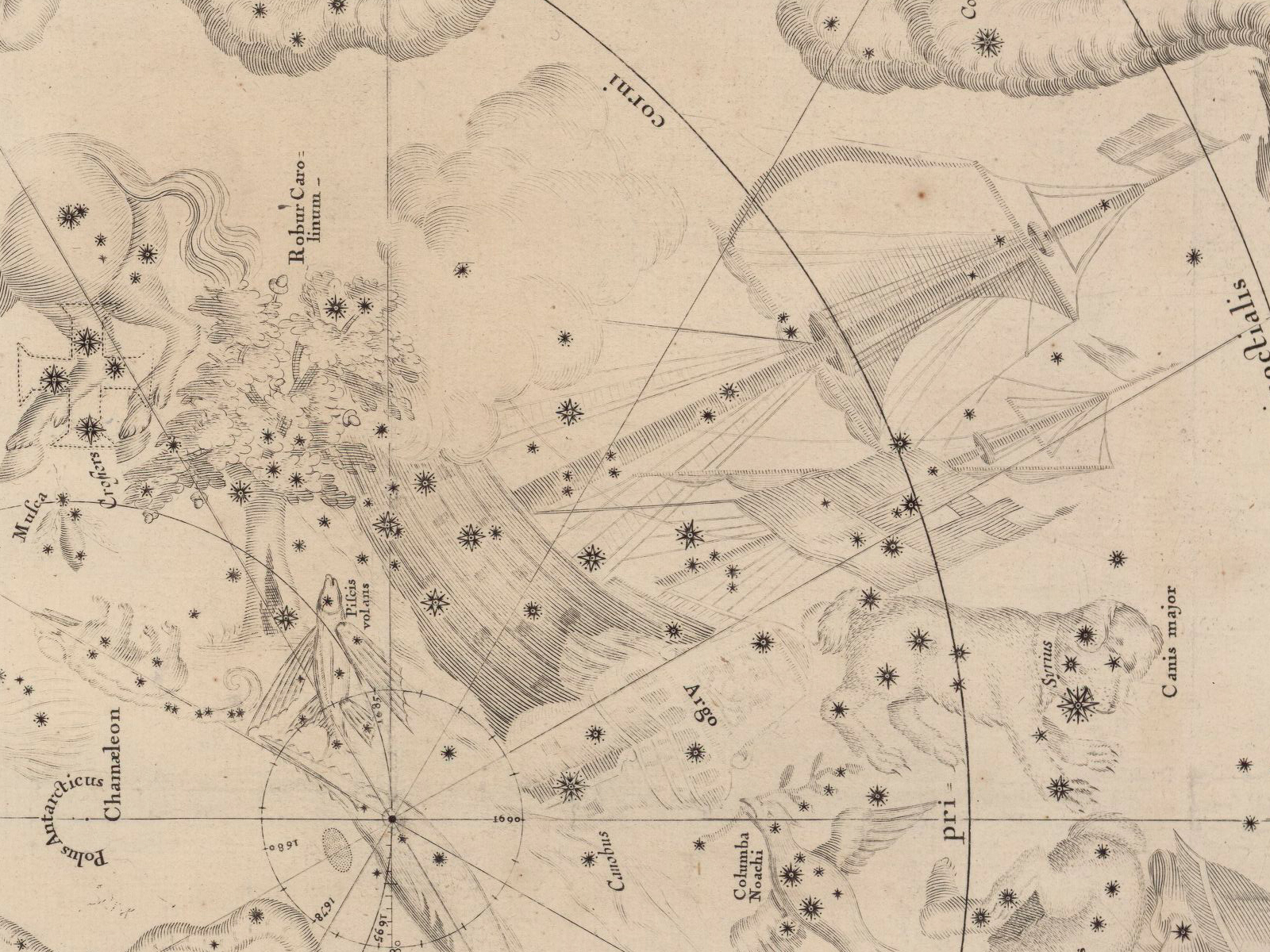
Robur Carolinum in Edmond Halley's chart of the southern celestial hemisphere

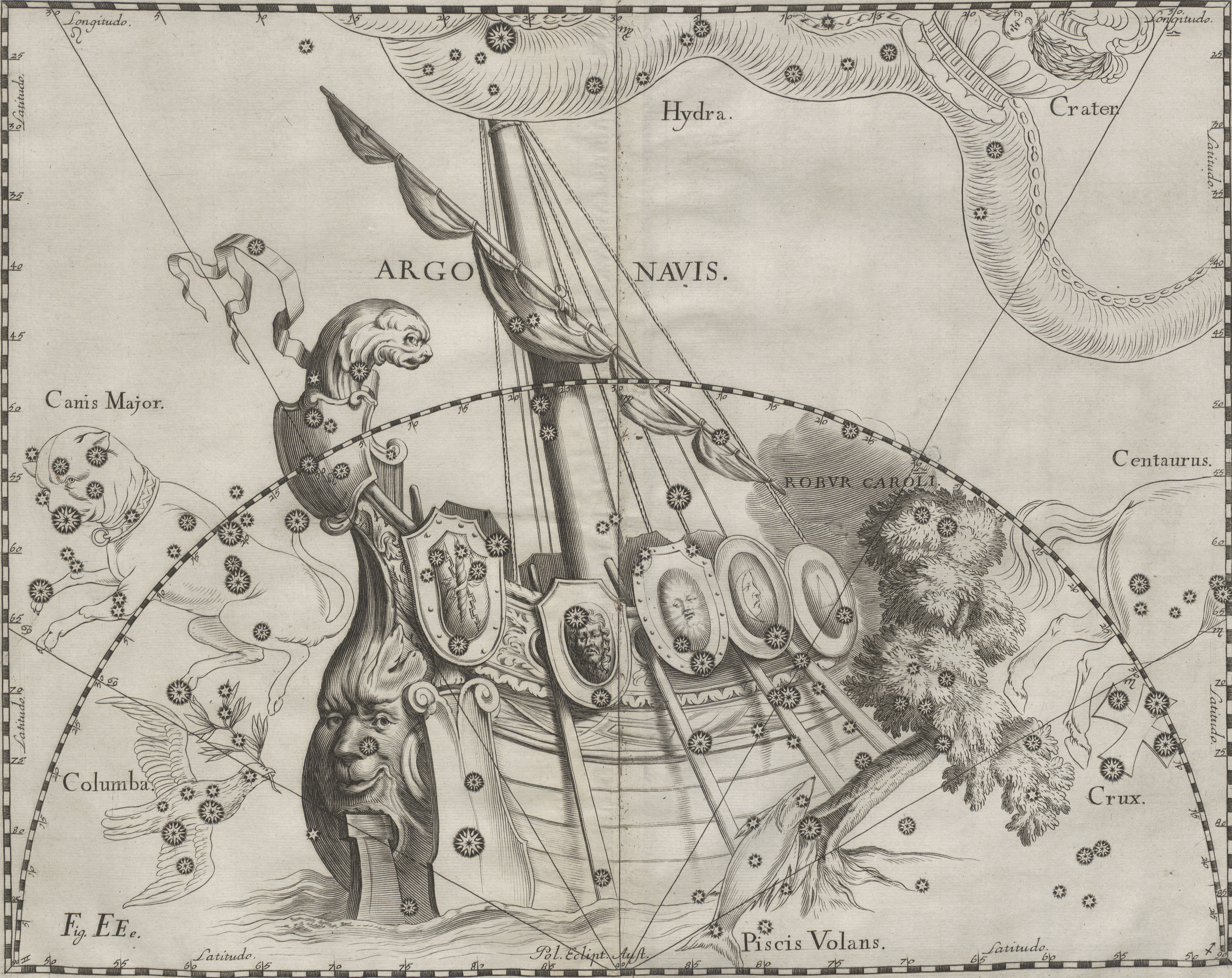
Robur Caroli in Johannes Hevelius's Uranographia.

Robur Caroli II in Johann Elert Bode's map of the southern celestial hemisphere

Robur Carolinum (Latin for "the Caroline" or "Charles Oak"), Robur Caroli ("Charles's Oak"), or Robur Caroli II ("Oak of Charles II") is a former constellation in the southern skies established by the English astronomer Edmond Halley in 1679. Its brightest star was Beta Carinae (β Car) or Miaplacidus, which was known as α Roburis or α Roburis Carolini. The stars forming Robur Carolinum now make up parts of Carina ("the Hull") and Vela ("the Sail").

== Name ==
The name refers to the Royal Oak where Halley's patron, King Charles II of England, Scotland, and Ireland, hid from the victorious troops of Oliver Cromwell after the 1651 Battle of Worcester.

== Location ==
Halley formed Robur Carolinum from stars in Argo Navis ("the Ship Argo"), another former constellation. Robur Carolinum was included in some star atlases into the 19th century, but it was eventually retired. Nicolas Louis de Lacaille complained that it took some of the finest stars from Argo Navis. In the end, Argo Navis was instead divided on Lacaille's plan into three separate constellations forming its main hull (Carina), its sail (Vela), and its poop deck (Puppis). The stars of Robur Carolinum are now part of Carina and Vela.

== See also ==
- Former constellations
