= FACSAT-1 =

FACSAT-1 is the second Colombian-made satellite sent to orbit, and the first on behalf of the Colombian Air Force.

== Characteristics ==
FACSAT-1 is a nanosatellite, capable of taking images with a resolution of 30 meters per pixel.

== Manufacture ==
The contract to manufacture FACSAT-1 was awarded to GomSpace A/S in 2014.

== Mission ==
FACSAT-1 was launched on November 29, 2018, at 04:15 UTC in the PSLV-C43 rocket of the Indian Space Agency (ISRO). It decayed from orbit on 3 June 2023.

== See also ==
- Libertad 1
