= HD 29573 =

Binary star system in the constellation Eridanus

Observation data Epoch J2000 Equinox ICRS
- Constellation: Eridanus
- Right ascension: 04^{h} 38^{m} 53.55015^{s}
- Declination: −12° 07′ 23.0681″
- Apparent magnitude (V): 4.99 (5.19 + 7.22)

Characteristics
- Spectral type: A0 V (A1 + F2)
- B−V color index: 0.074±0.003

Astrometry
Radial velocity (R_{v})	+2.9±0.8 km/s
Proper motion (μ)	RA: −60.614 mas/yr Dec.: −16.417 mas/yr
Parallax (π)	14.2348±0.3656 mas
Distance	229 ± 6 ly (70 ± 2 pc)
Absolute magnitude (M_{V})	0.73

Orbit
Period (P)	40.9±1.386 yr
Semi-major axis (a)	0.2844±0.0055″
Eccentricity (e)	0.759±0.180
Inclination (i)	75.5±2.2°
Longitude of the node (Ω)	152.0±1.8°
Periastron epoch (T)	2003.805
Argument of periastron (ω) (secondary)	284.1±11.0°

Details

HD 29573 A
Mass	2.28 M_{☉}
Luminosity	51.8+4.6 −4.3 L_{☉}
Temperature	8,892+103 −102 K
Rotational velocity (v sin i)	27 km/s

HD 29573 B
Mass	1.56 M_{☉}

Other designations
- BD−12°955, GJ 9161, HD 29573, HIP 21644, HR 1483, SAO 149789, WDS J04389-1207AB

Database references
SIMBAD	data

HD 29573 is a binary star system in the constellation Eridanus. It has a combined apparent visual magnitude of 4.99, making it visible to the naked eye. Based upon an annual parallax shift of 14.23 mas, it is located 229 light years from the Sun. The system is moving further away from Earth with a heliocentric radial velocity of +3 km/s.

The binary nature of this system was discovered through observations made with the Hipparcos spacecraft. The pair orbit each other with a period of 41 years and an eccentricity of 0.8. The magnitude 5.19 primary component has a class of A1, 2.28 times the mass of the Sun, and is a suspected chemically peculiar star. The secondary has magnitude 7.22, 1.56 times the Sun's mass, and a class of F2. The system has a possible infrared excess due to circumstellar dust.
