= Vela supernova remnant =

Supernova remnant in the constellation Vela

Diffuse nebula
- supernova remnant
- Vela supernova remnant imaged by European Southern Observatory

Observation data: J2000.0 epoch
- Right ascension: 08^{h} 35^{m} 20.66^{s}
- Declination: −45° 10′ 35.2″
- Distance: 936+62 −55 ly (287+19 −17 pc)
- Apparent magnitude (V): 12
- Apparent dimensions (V): 8 degrees (approx.)
- Constellation: Vela
- Designations: Vela SNR, Vela XYZ, Gum 16, SNR G263.9-03.3, 1E 0840.0-4430, RE J083854-430902

The Vela supernova remnant (Vela SNR) is a supernova remnant in the southern constellation Vela. Its source Type II supernova exploded approximately 11,000 years ago (and was about 900 light-years away). The association of the Vela supernova remnant with the Vela Pulsar was made by astronomers at the University of Sydney in 1968; this, along with the Crab Pulsar, was among the first direct observational evidence that supernovae form neutron stars.

The Vela supernova remnant includes NGC 2736. Viewed from Earth, the Vela supernova remnant overlaps the Puppis A supernova remnant, which is four times more distant. Both the Puppis and Vela remnants are among the largest and brightest features in the X-ray sky.

The Vela supernova remnant is one of the closest known to Earth, being around 800 light years away. The Geminga pulsar is closer (and also resulted from a supernova), and in 1998 another near-Earth supernova remnant was discovered, RX J0852.0-4622, which from Earth's point of view appears to be contained in the southeastern part of the Vela remnant. This remnant was not seen earlier because when viewed in most wavelengths, it is lost in the Vela remnant.

== Younger Dryas hypothesis ==
Due to the distance, proximity and size of the Vela supernova, it has been suggested that the supernova could have been a trigger for the Younger Dryas climate event that marked the end of the last ice age. While this theory is not very well accepted in scientific literature, many have considered it a possibility due to the time ranges of both events, possible damage to the ozone layer and rises in carbon-14 observed in tree rings.

== Gallery ==
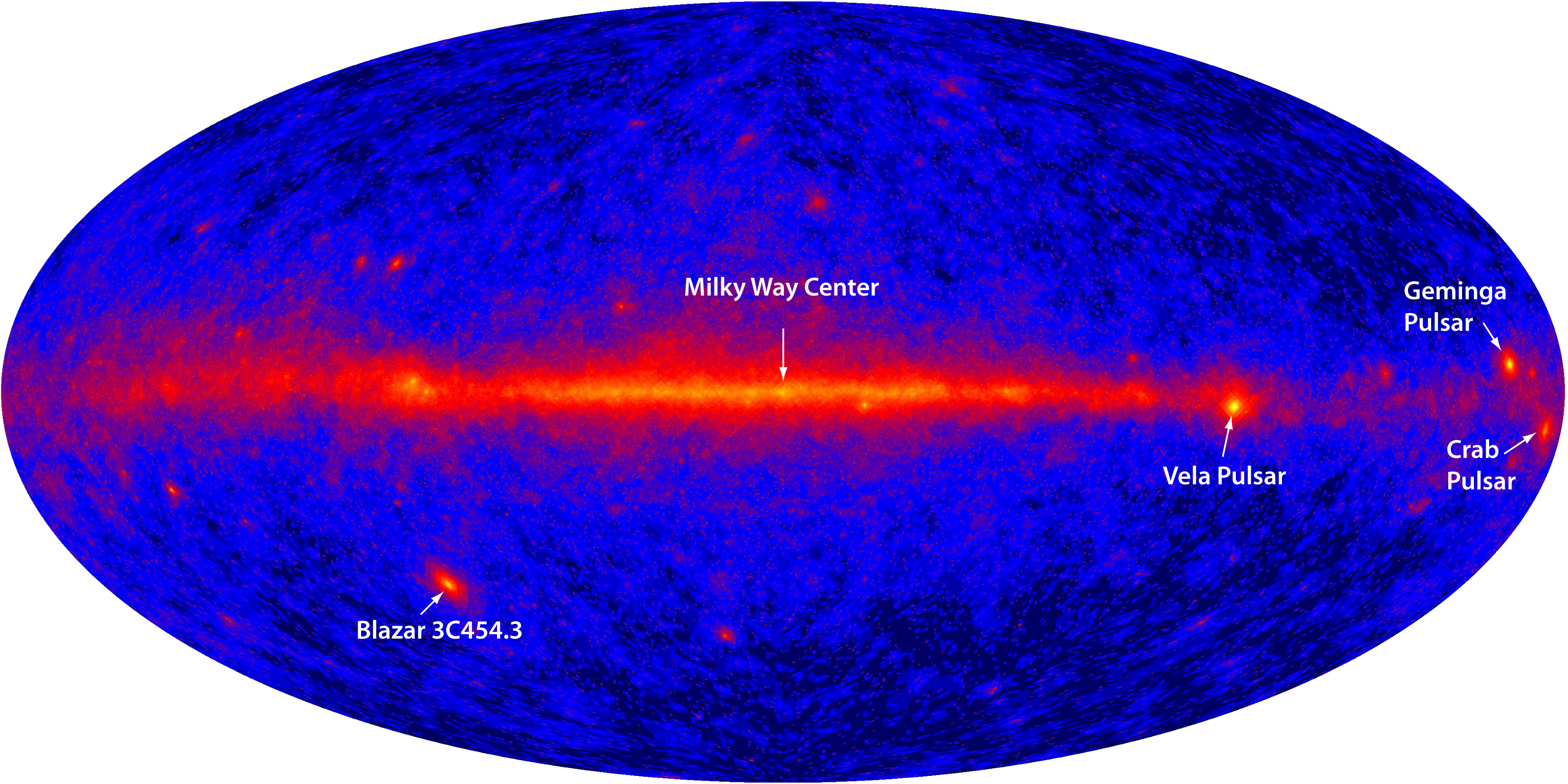
Position of Vela in the Milky Way

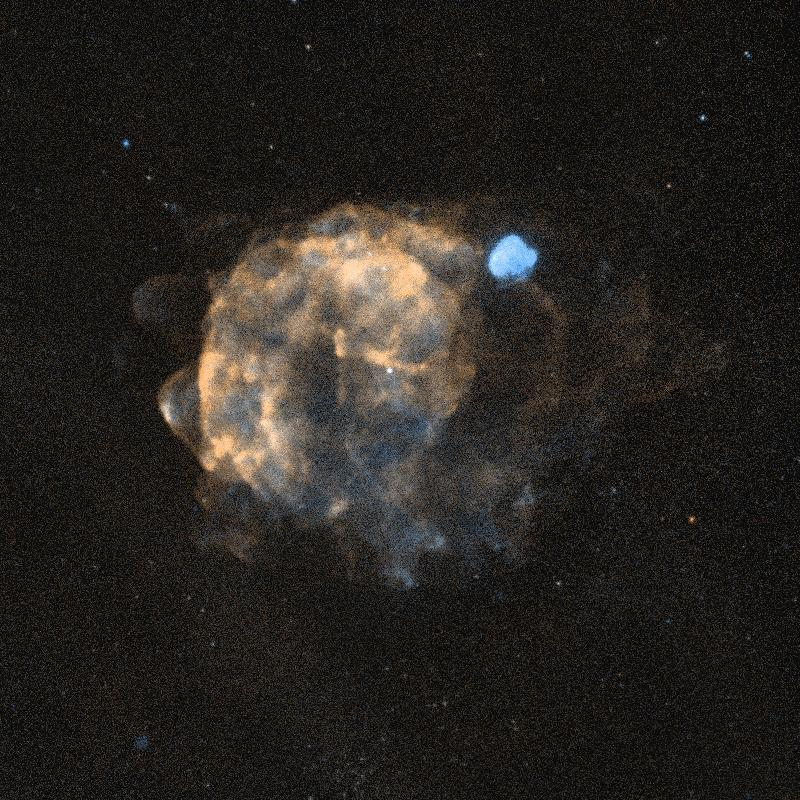
Vela Supernova Remnant, imaged by ROSAT

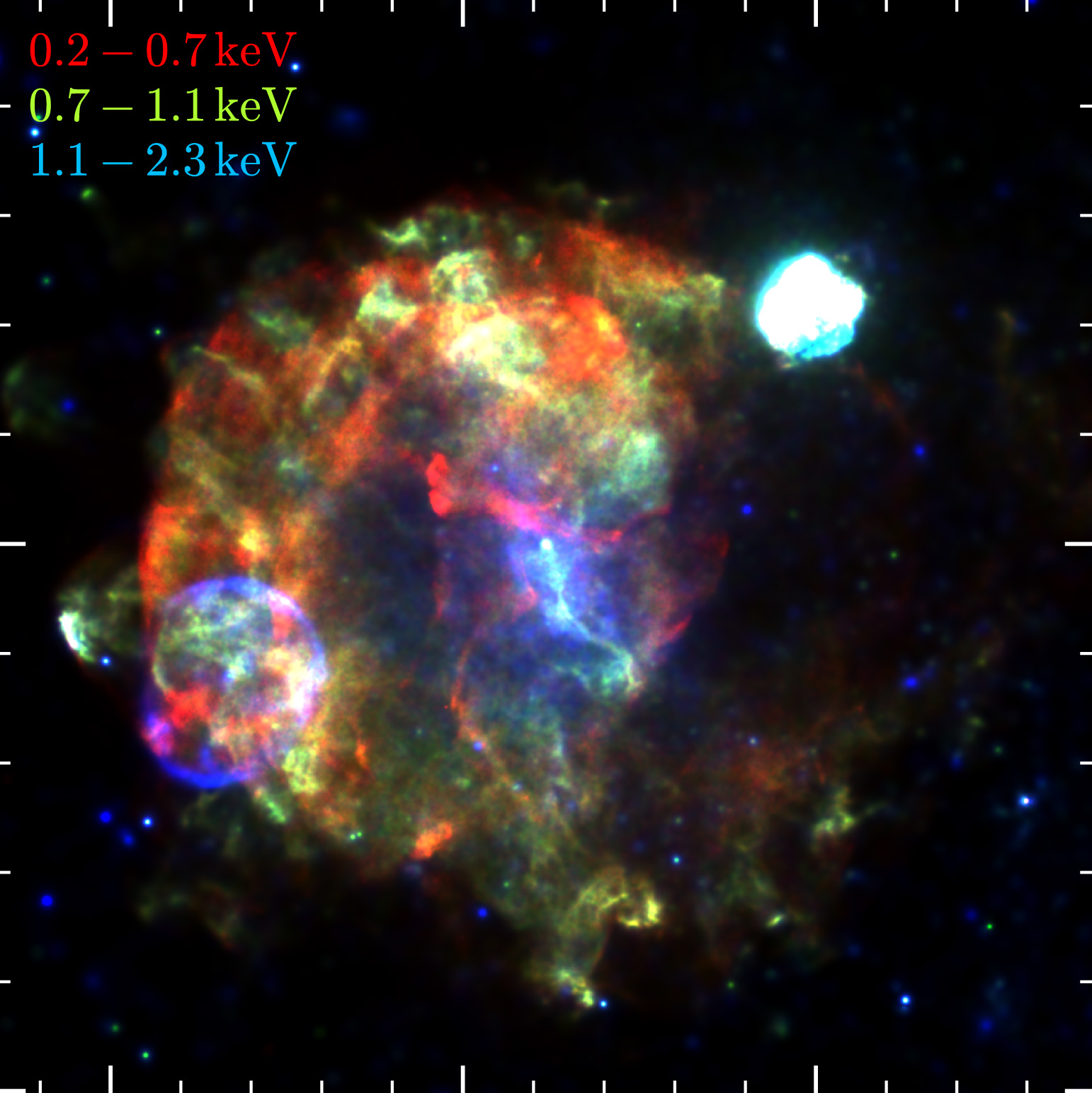
Color enhanced image of the remnant with eROSITA. The bright blue object on the upper right is Puppis A. The blue circular nebula on the lower left is "Vela Junior" RX J0852.0−4622.

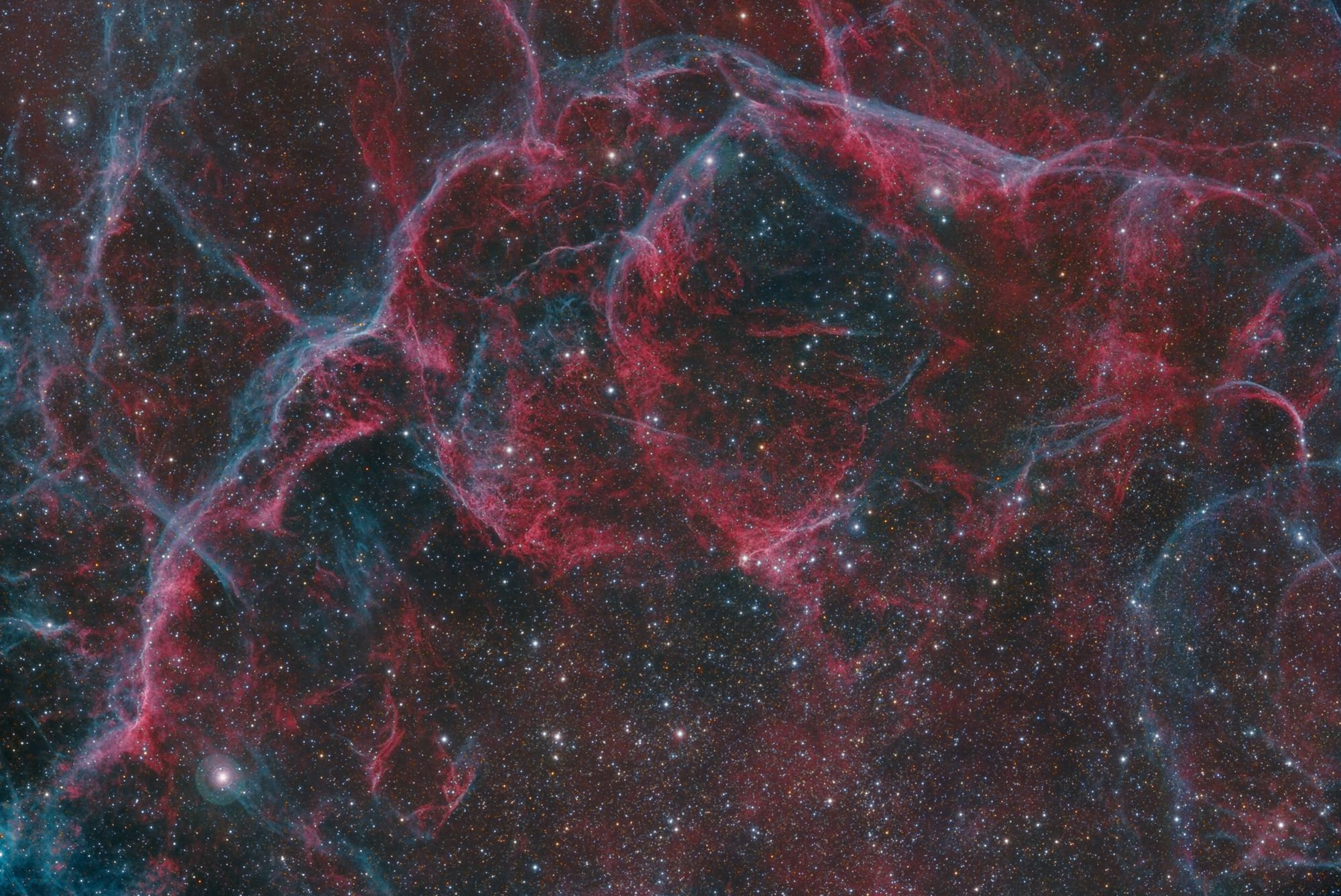
The northern portion of the Vela Supernova Remnant. North is to the left.

== See also ==
- CG 4
- List of supernova remnants
- List of supernovae
- Vela star-forming regions
