= Luxinnovation =

Coordinates: 49°37′25.51″N 6°8′53.21″E

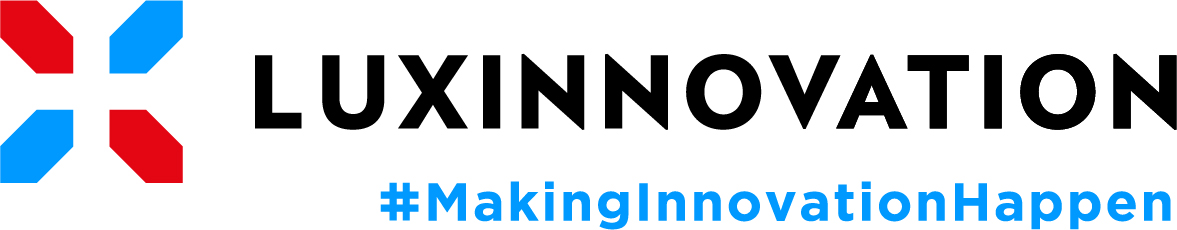
- Legal status: Economic Interest Grouping (EIG)
- Established: 1984
- Location: Esch-Belval, Luxembourg
- CEO: Mario Grotz
- Management Committee: Sarah Bouchon, Pauline Laparra, Cécile Lorenzini, Philippe Mayer, Emilie Zimer
- Languages: French, German, English and Luxembourgish
- URL: www.luxinnovation.lu

Luxinnovation is the Luxembourg national innovation agency.
