= Extraterrestrial sky =

Extraterrestrial view of outer space

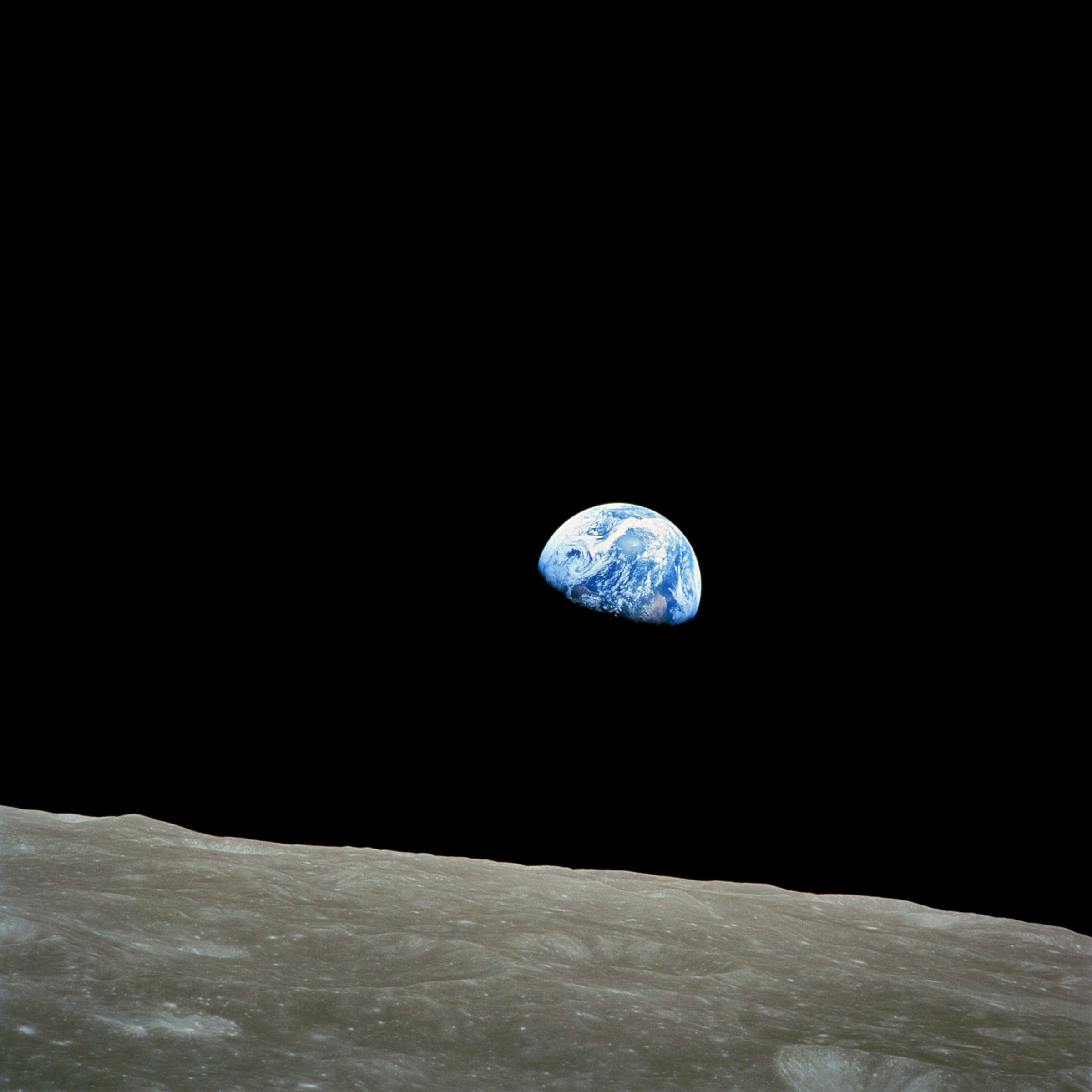
A historic extraterrestrial sky—Earthrise, the Earth viewed from the Moon. Taken by Apollo 8 astronaut William Anders while in lunar orbit, December 24, 1968.

In astronomy, an extraterrestrial sky is a view of outer space from the surface of an astronomical body other than Earth.

The only extraterrestrial sky that has been directly observed and photographed by astronauts is that of the Moon. The skies of Venus, Mars and Titan have been observed by space probes designed to land on the surface and transmit images back to Earth.

Characteristics of extraterrestrial sky appear to vary substantially due to a number of factors. An extraterrestrial atmosphere, if present, has a large bearing on visible characteristics. The atmosphere's density and chemical composition can contribute to differences in color, opacity (including haze) and the presence of clouds. Astronomical objects may also be visible and can include natural satellites, rings, star systems and nebulas and other planetary system bodies.

== Luminosity and angular diameter of the Sun ==
The Sun's apparent magnitude changes according to the inverse square law, therefore, the difference in magnitude as a result of greater or lesser distances from different celestial bodies can be predicted by the following formula:

$$\text{intensity} \ \propto \ \frac{1}{\text{distance}^2} \,$$

Where "distance" can be in km, AU, or any other appropriate unit.

To illustrate, since Pluto is 40 AU away from the Sun on average, it follows that the parent star would appear to be $\frac{1}{1600}$ times as bright as it is on Earth.

Though a terrestrial observer would find a dramatic decrease in available sunlight in these environments, the Sun would still be bright enough to cast shadows even as far as the hypothetical Planet Nine, possibly located 1,200 AU away, and by analogy would still outshine the full Moon as seen from Earth.

The change in angular diameter of the Sun with distance is illustrated in the diagram below:

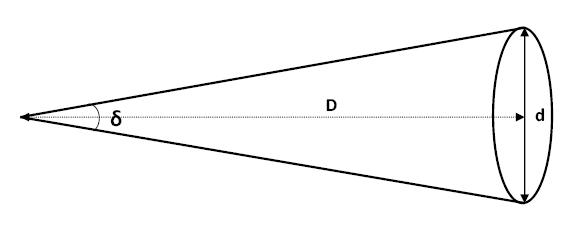
Diagram for the formula of the angular diameter

The angular diameter of a circle whose plane is perpendicular to the displacement vector between the point of view and the center of said circle can be calculated using the formula (Note: This can be derived using the formula for the length of a cord found at https://mathworld.wolfram.com/CircularSegment.html)

$$\delta =  2\arctan \left(\frac{d}{2D}\right),$$

in which $\delta$ is the angular diameter, and $d$ and $D$ are the actual diameter of and the distance to the object. When $D \gg d$, we have $\delta \approx d / D$, and the result obtained is in radians.

For a spherical object whose actual diameter equals $d_\mathrm{act},$ and where $D$ is the distance to the center of the sphere, the angular diameter can be found by the formula

$$\delta =  2\arcsin \left(\frac{d_\mathrm{act}}{2D}\right)$$

The difference is due to the fact that the apparent edges of a sphere are its tangent points, which are closer to the observer than the center of the sphere. For practical use, the distinction is significant only for spherical objects that are relatively close, since the small-angle approximation holds for $x \ll 1$:

$$\arcsin x \approx \arctan x \approx x$$.

== Horizon ==
On terrestrial planets and other solid celestial bodies with negligible atmospheric effects, the distance to the horizon for a "standard observer" varies as the square root of the planet's radius. Thus, the horizon on Mercury is 62% as far away from the observer as it is on Earth, on Mars the figure is 73%, on the Moon the figure is 52%, on Mimas the figure is 18%, and so on. The observer's height must be taken into account when calculating the distance to the horizon.

== Sun ==
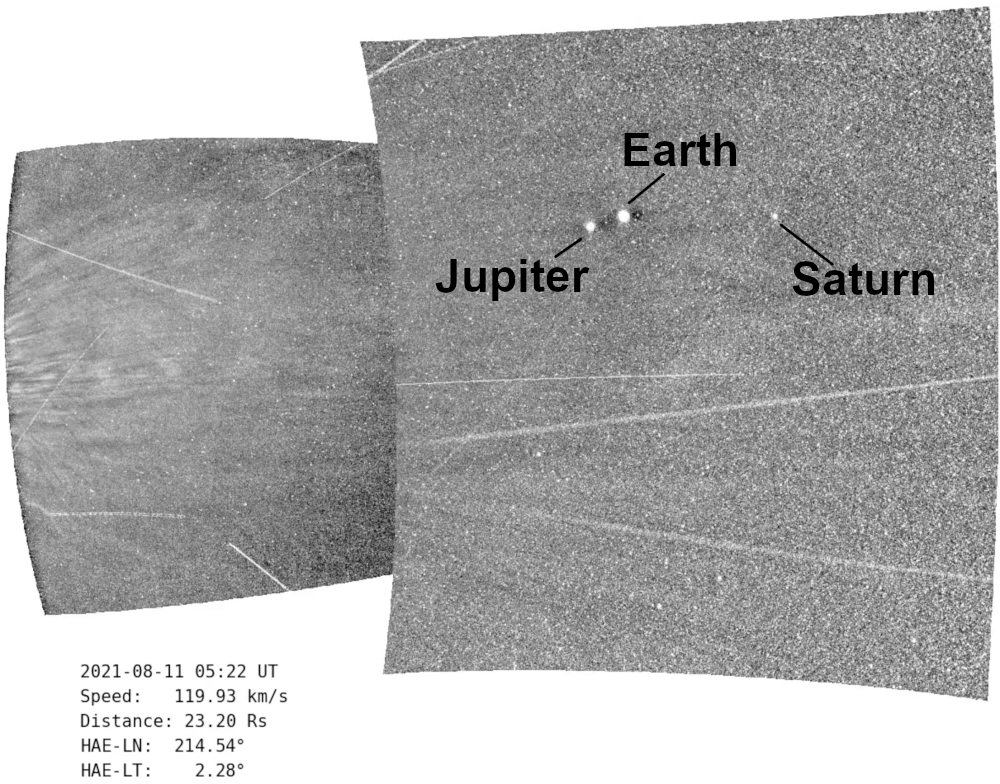
Image and video of Earth from within the outer solar corona, taken during the second time that any probe has ever reached the corona.

The sky of the Sun is dominated by the Solar corona and probes coming close to the Sun have to shield from the Sun's radiation to view space without being overwhelmed by the corona, as with the Parker Solar Probe.

== Mercury ==
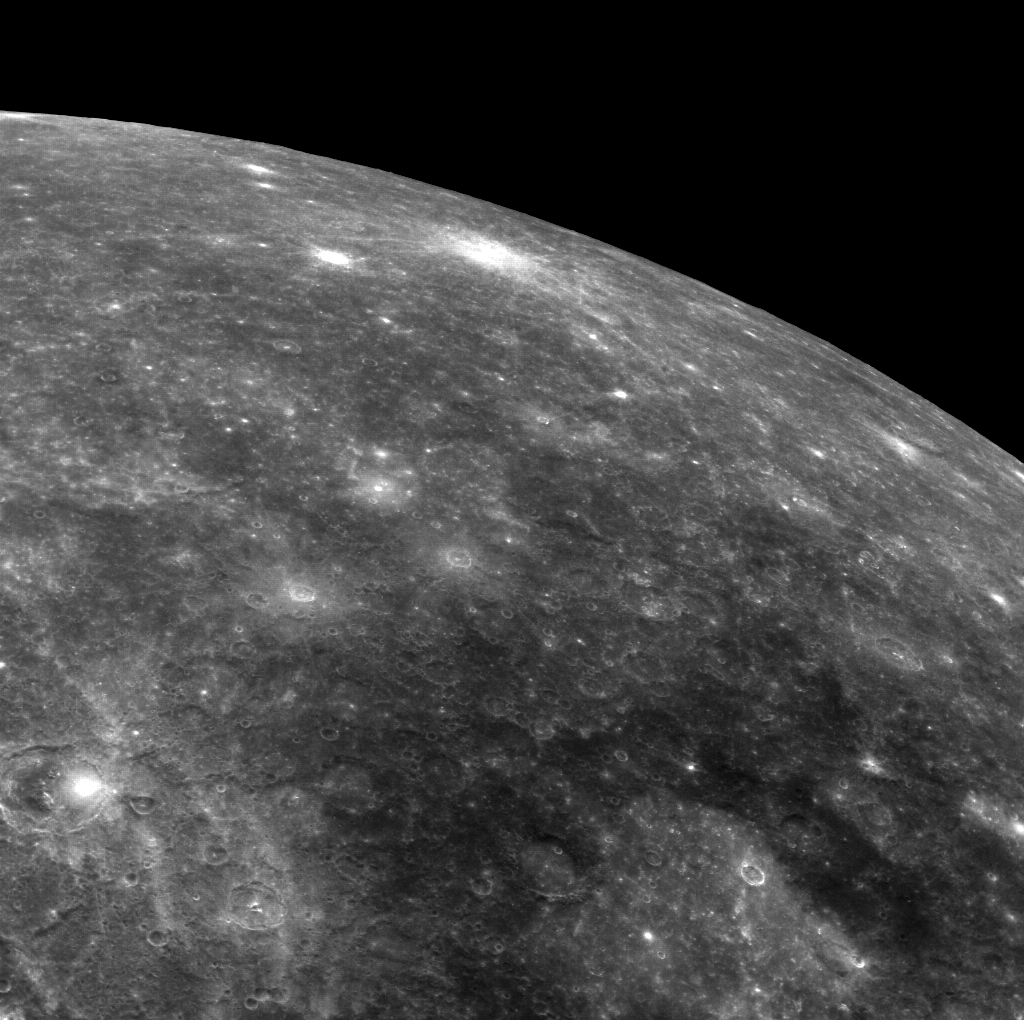
Mercury – sky viewed from orbit

Because Mercury has little atmosphere, a view of the planet's skies would be no different from viewing space from orbit. Mercury has a southern pole star, α Pictoris, a magnitude 3.2 star. It is fainter than Earth's Polaris (α Ursae Minoris). Omicron Draconis is its north star.

=== Other planets seen from Mercury ===
After the Sun, the second-brightest object in the Mercurian sky is Venus, which is much brighter there than for terrestrial observers. The reason for this is that when Venus is closest to Earth, it is between the Earth and the Sun, so we see only its night side. Indeed, even when Venus is brightest in the Earth's sky, we are actually seeing only a narrow crescent. For a Mercurian observer, on the other hand, Venus is closest when it is in opposition to the Sun and is showing its full disk. The apparent magnitude of Venus is as bright as −7.7.

The Earth and the Moon are also very prominent, their apparent magnitudes being about −5 and −1.2, respectively. The maximum apparent distance between the Earth and the Moon is about 15′. All other planets are visible just as they are on Earth, but somewhat less bright at opposition with the difference being most considerable for Mars.

The zodiacal light is probably more prominent than it is from Earth.

== Venus ==
The atmosphere of Venus is so thick that the Sun is not distinguishable in the daytime sky, and the stars are not visible at night. Being closer to the Sun, Venus receives about 1.9 times more sunlight than Earth, but due to the thick atmosphere, only about 20% of the light reaches the surface. Color images taken by the Soviet Venera probes suggest that the sky on Venus is orange. If the Sun could be seen from Venus's surface, the time from one sunrise to the next (a solar day) would be 116.75 Earth days. Because of Venus's retrograde rotation, the Sun would appear to rise in the west and set in the east.

An observer aloft in Venus's cloud tops, on the other hand, would circumnavigate the planet in about four Earth days and see a sky in which Earth and the Moon shine brightly (about magnitudes −6.6 and −2.7, respectively) at opposition. The maximum angular separation between the Moon and Earth from the perspective of Venus is 0.612°, or approximately the same separation of one centimeter of separation at a distance of one meter and coincidentally, about the apparent size of the Moon as seen from Earth. Mercury would also be easy to spot, because it is closer and brighter, at up to magnitude −2.7, and because its maximum elongation from the Sun is considerably larger (40.5°) than when observed from Earth (28.3°).

42 Draconis is the closest star to the north pole of Venus. Eta^{1} Doradus is the closest to its south pole. (Note: The IAU uses the right-hand rule to define a positive pole for the purpose of determining orientation. Using this convention, Venus is tilted 177° ("upside down"), and the positive pole is instead the south pole.)

== Earth orbit ==
Earth orbit has been the main vantage point of observations of extraterrestrial skies, like for Earth observation or space observatories. Space observatories make use of the lack of the filtering atmosphere to make more detailed and stable observations. Astronauts on space stations or going the furthest, to the Moon, have vividly observed and described the skies from outside of Earth. They have reported from observing the Earth and space from their extraterrestrial locations as an awe inspiring experience, an experience often described as the overview effect and on the way to the Moon and its extraterrestrial sky as instilling moon joy.

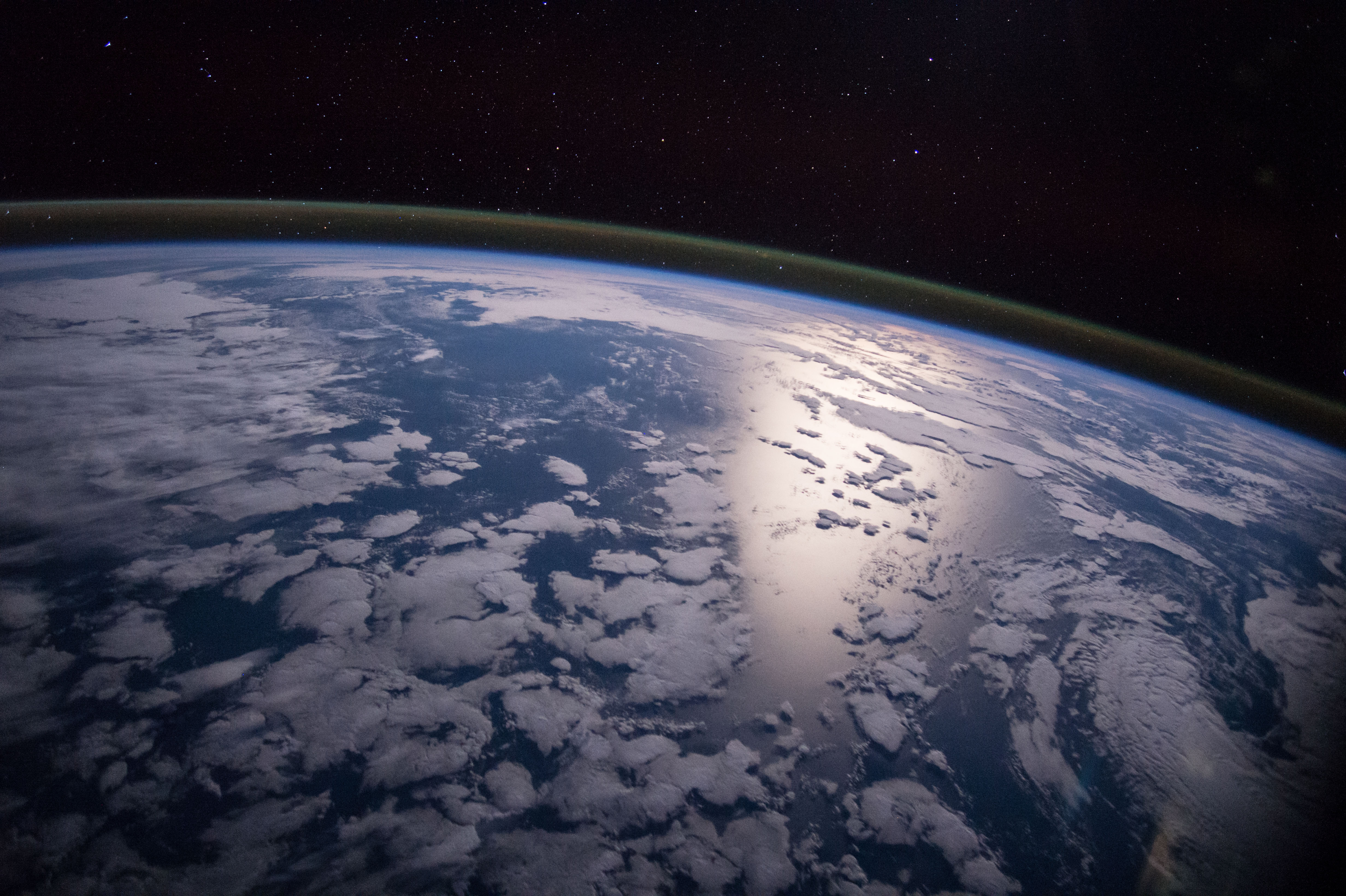
A view of Earth with different layers of its atmosphere visible: the troposphere with its clouds casting shadows, a band of stratospheric blue sky at the horizon, and a line of green airglow of the lower thermosphere around an altitude of 100 km, at the edge of space

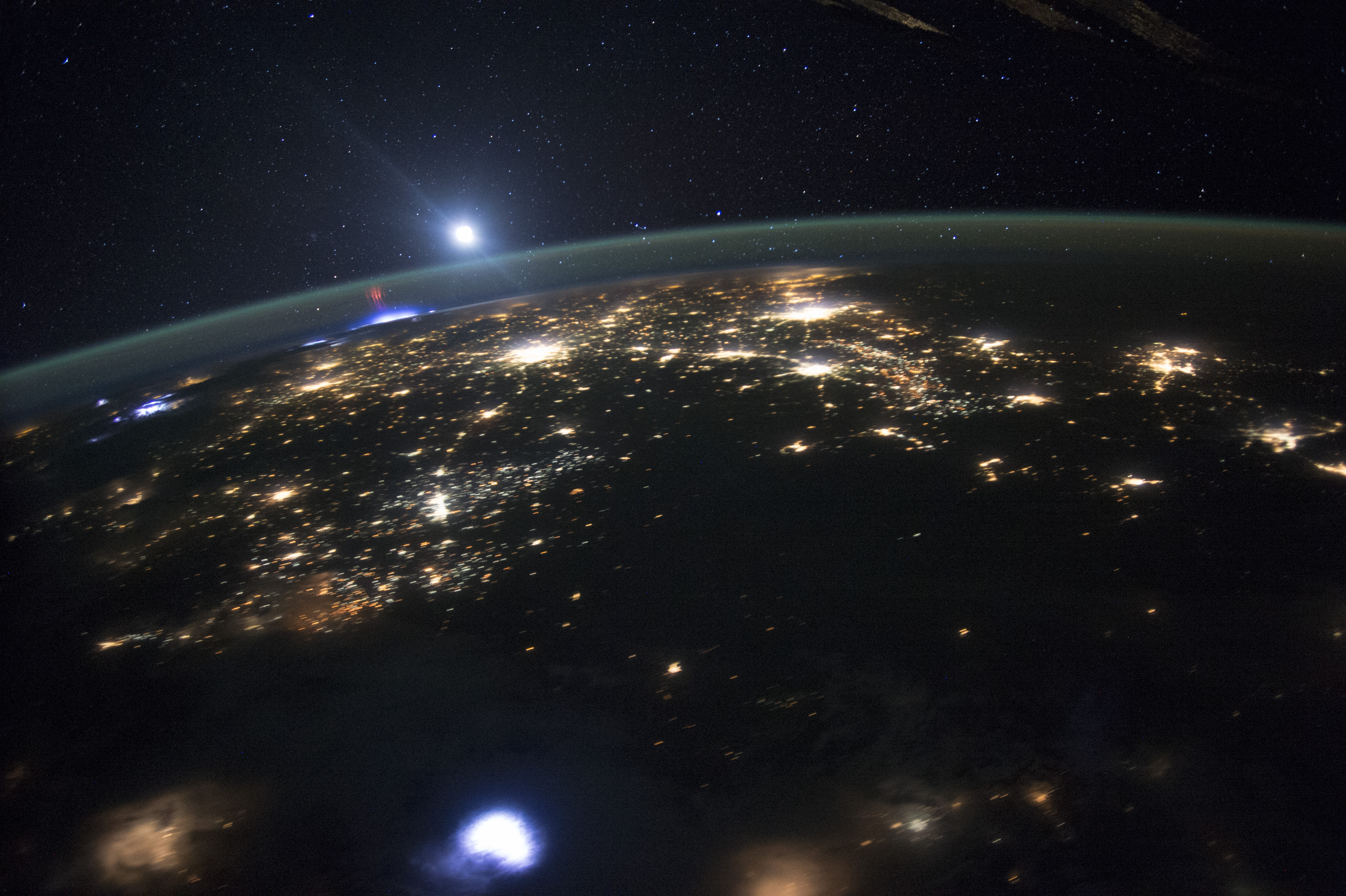
Night side of Earth with artificial lights and lightning in the troposphere, including at the horizon a red sprite lightning, and above the green line of airglow at the upper mesopause and border to space (the bright light above is the Moon).

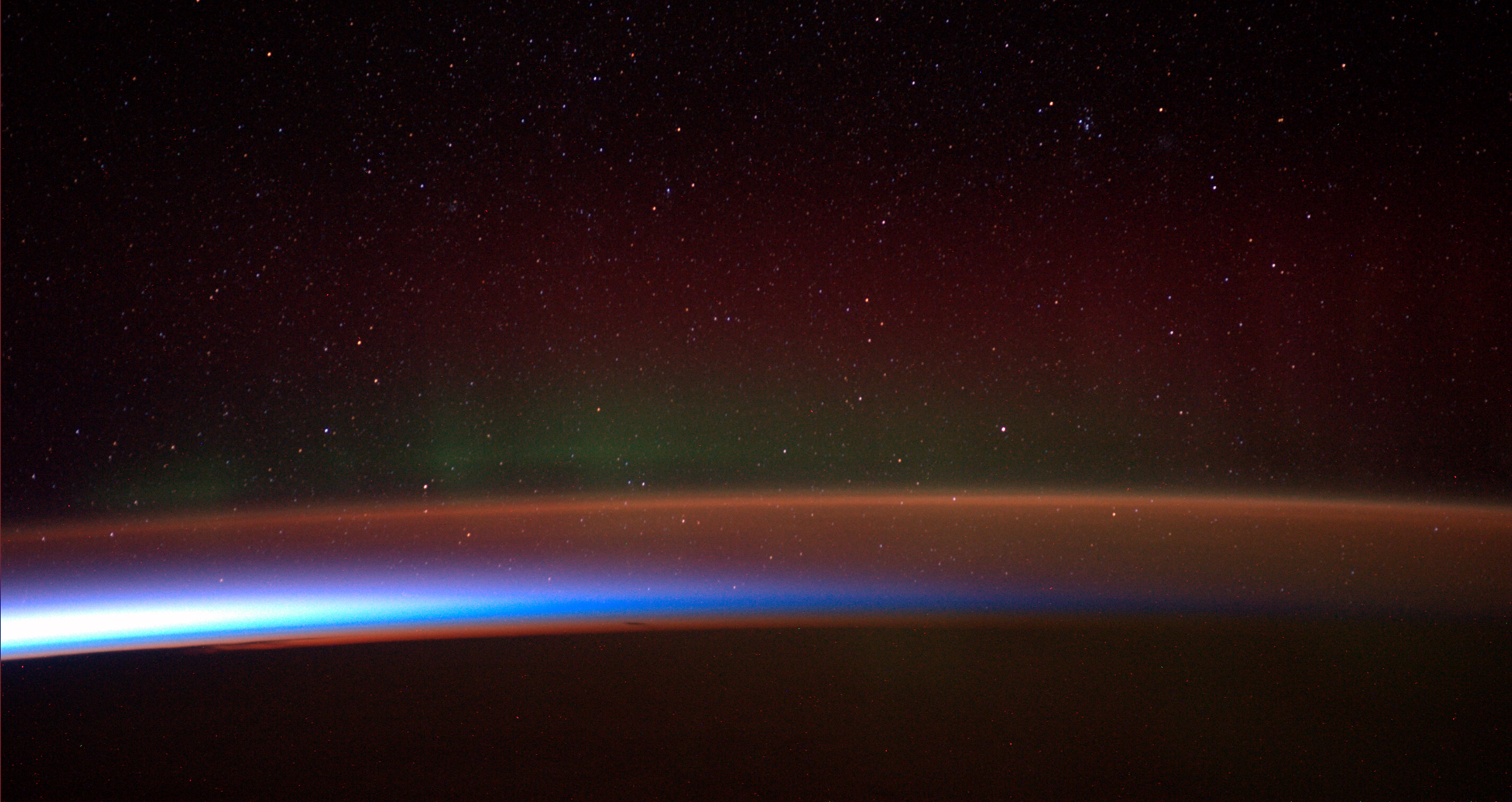
Earth's night-side upper atmosphere appearing from the bottom as bands of afterglow illuminating the troposphere in orange with silhouettes of clouds, and the stratosphere in white and blue. Next the mesosphere (pink area) extends to the orange and faintly green line of the lowest airglow, at about one hundred kilometers at the edge of space and the lower edge of the thermosphere (invisible). Continuing with green and red bands of aurorae stretching over several hundred kilometers.

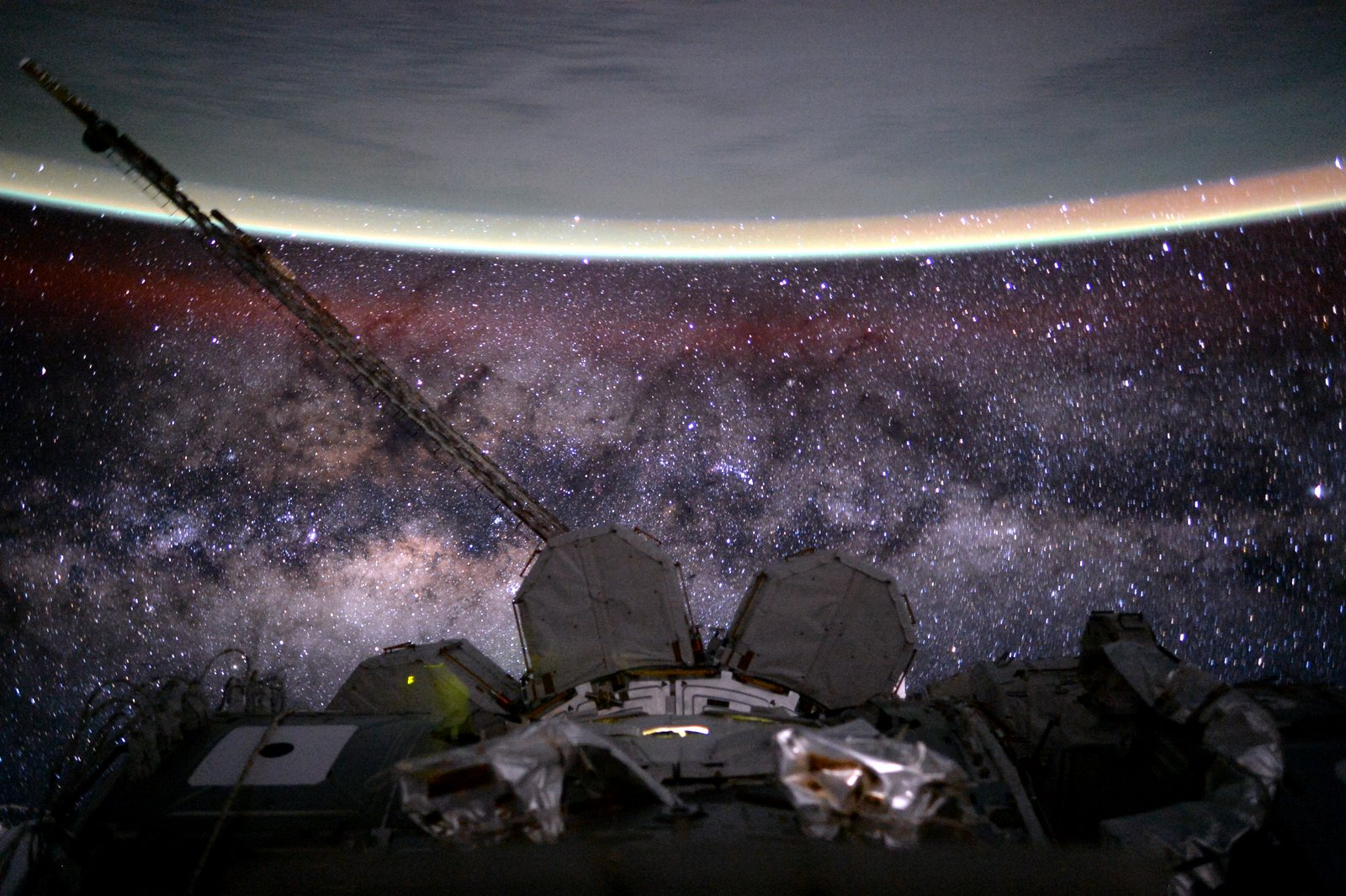
View from International Space Station, showing the yellow-green airglow of Earth's ionosphere with the Milky Way in the background.

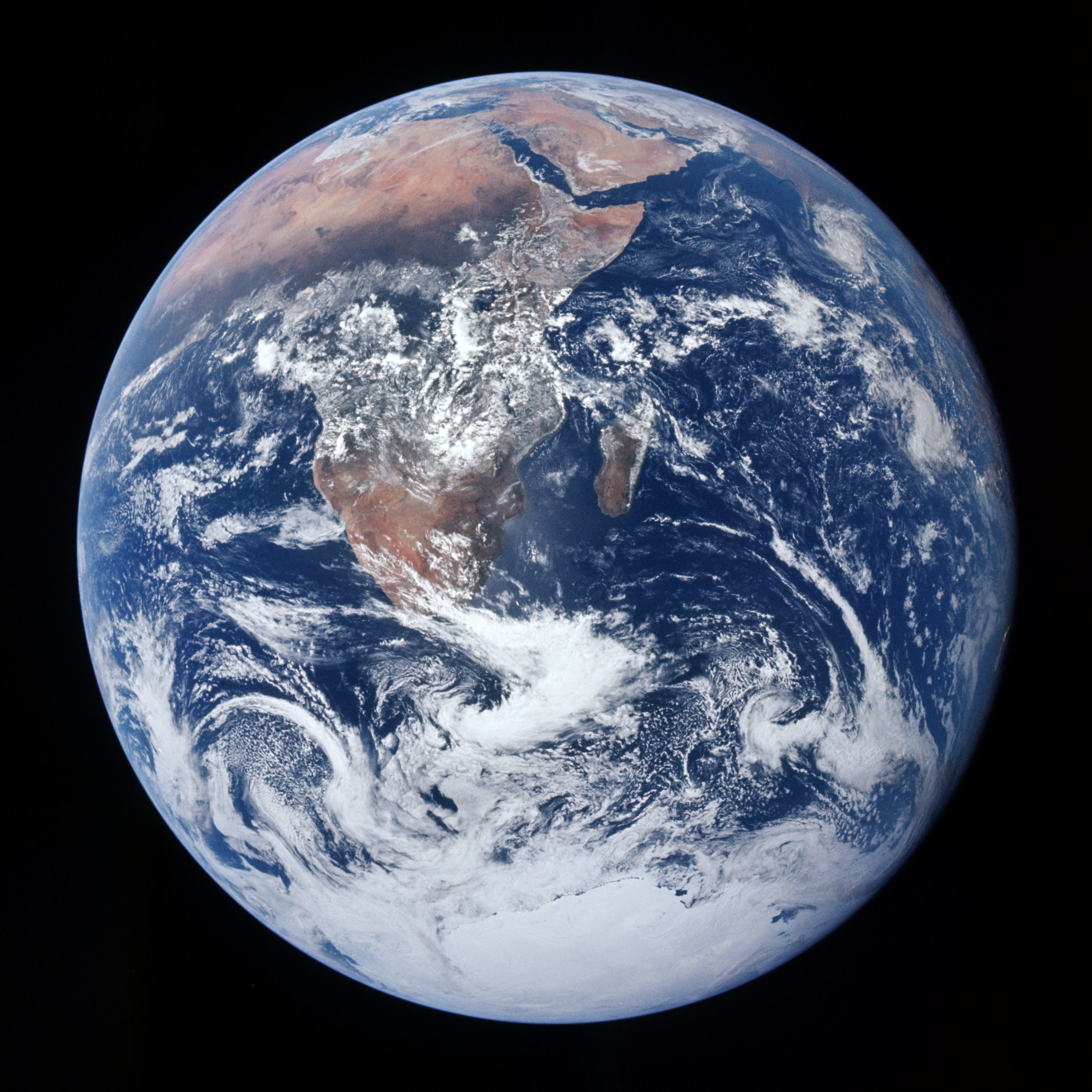
The famous Blue Marble photo

Hello, World, the first full-disk photo of Earth taken by a human to show Earth's night side illuminated by moonlight, with city lights, airglow, two auroras, afterglow, zodiacal light and Venus.

== The Moon ==
The Moon's atmosphere is negligibly thin, essentially vacuum, so its sky is black, as in the case of Mercury. At lunar twilight astronauts have though observed some crepuscular rays and lunar horizon glow of the illuminated atmosphere, beside interplanetary light phenomenons like zodiacal light. Furthermore, the Sun is so bright that it is still very difficult to see stars during the lunar daytime, except possibly very bright ones like Sirius, unless the observer is well shielded from sunlight (direct or reflected from the ground), while the brightest planets are observable. On the lunar near side during lunar night this is similarly the case due to the brightness of the Earth reflecting sunlight, producing the so-called earthshine, creating about 43 times and up to 55 times brighter surface conditions on the Moon than a full moon on Earth.

The Moon has a southern polar star, δ Doradus, a magnitude 4.34 star. It is better aligned than Earth's Polaris (α Ursae Minoris), but much fainter. Its north pole star is Omicron Draconis. (Note: note: due to axial precession, the lunar pole describes a small circle on the celestial sphere every 18.6 years. Patrick Moore (1983), The Guinness Book of Astronomy Facts & Feats, p. 29, "In 1968 the north pole star of the Moon was Omega Draconis; by 1977 it was 36 Draconis. The south pole star is Delta Doradus.")

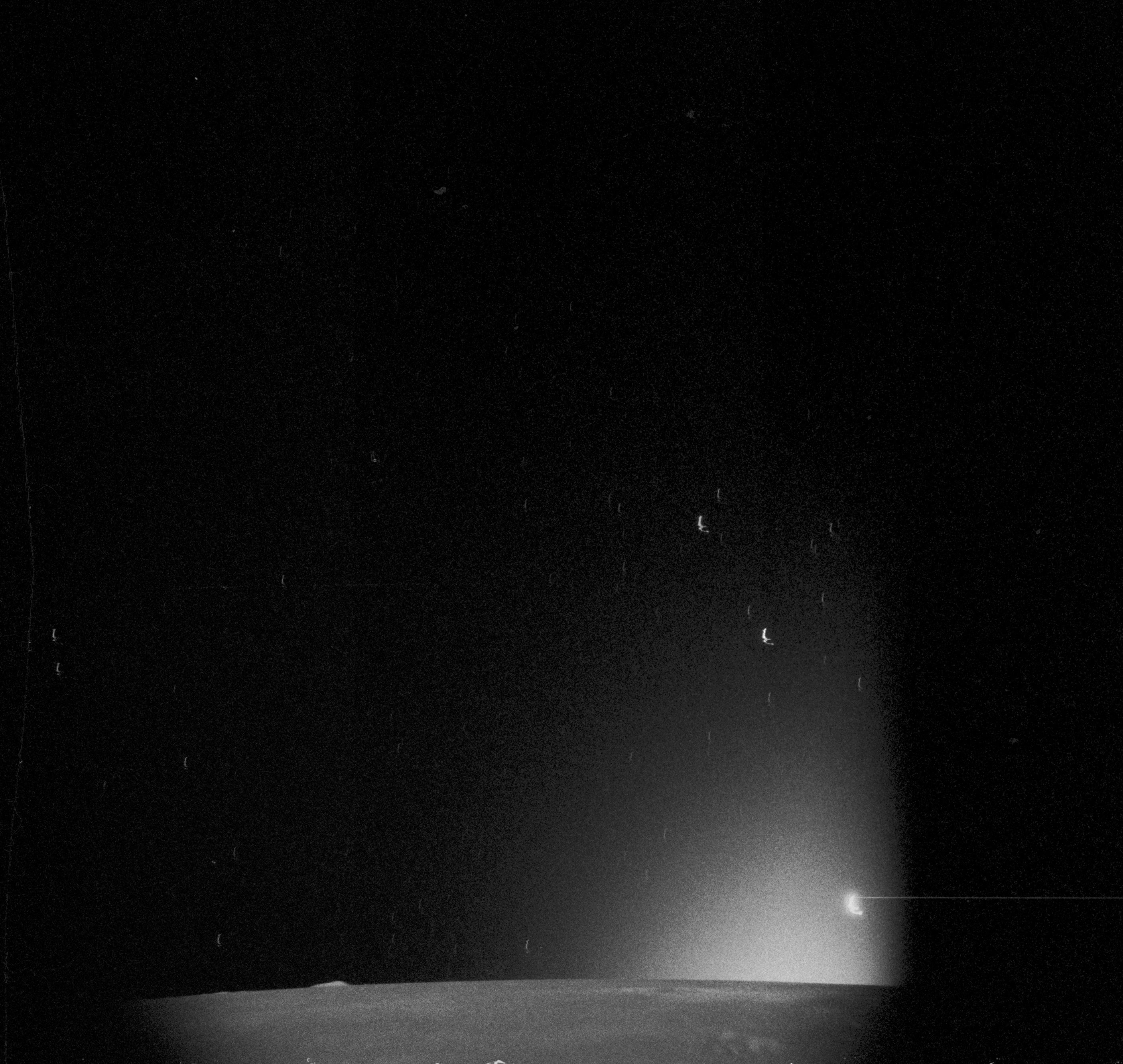
Solar corona and the zodiacal light spiking along the ecliptic where Venus is visible, the brightest blurred star-like object in the photograph, viewed from the Moon under earthshine, during Apollo 15

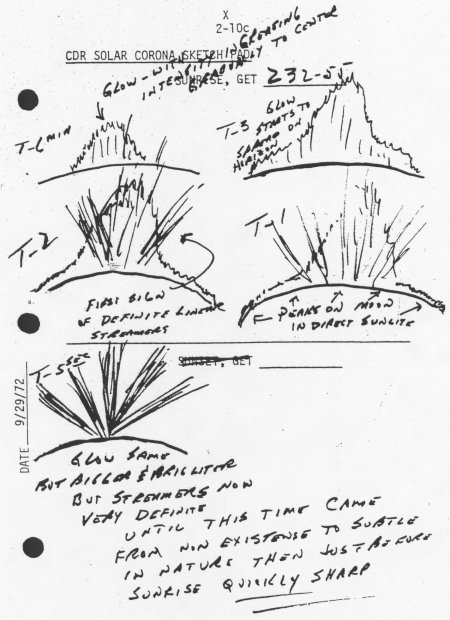
The thin lunar atmosphere is visible on the Moon's surface at sunrise and sunset with the lunar horizon glow and lunar twilight rays, like Earth's crepuscular rays. This Apollo 17 sketch depicts the glow and rays among the general zodiacal light.

=== Sun and Earth in the lunar sky ===
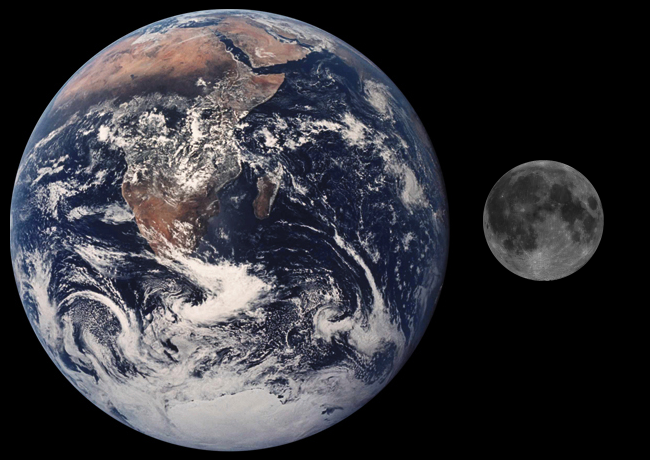
In the Moon's sky Earth has an angular size of 1° 48′ to 2°, about 3.7 times the apparent size of the Moon or Sun in Earth's sky (due to the near equal apparent size of the Moon and Sun at lunar distance).

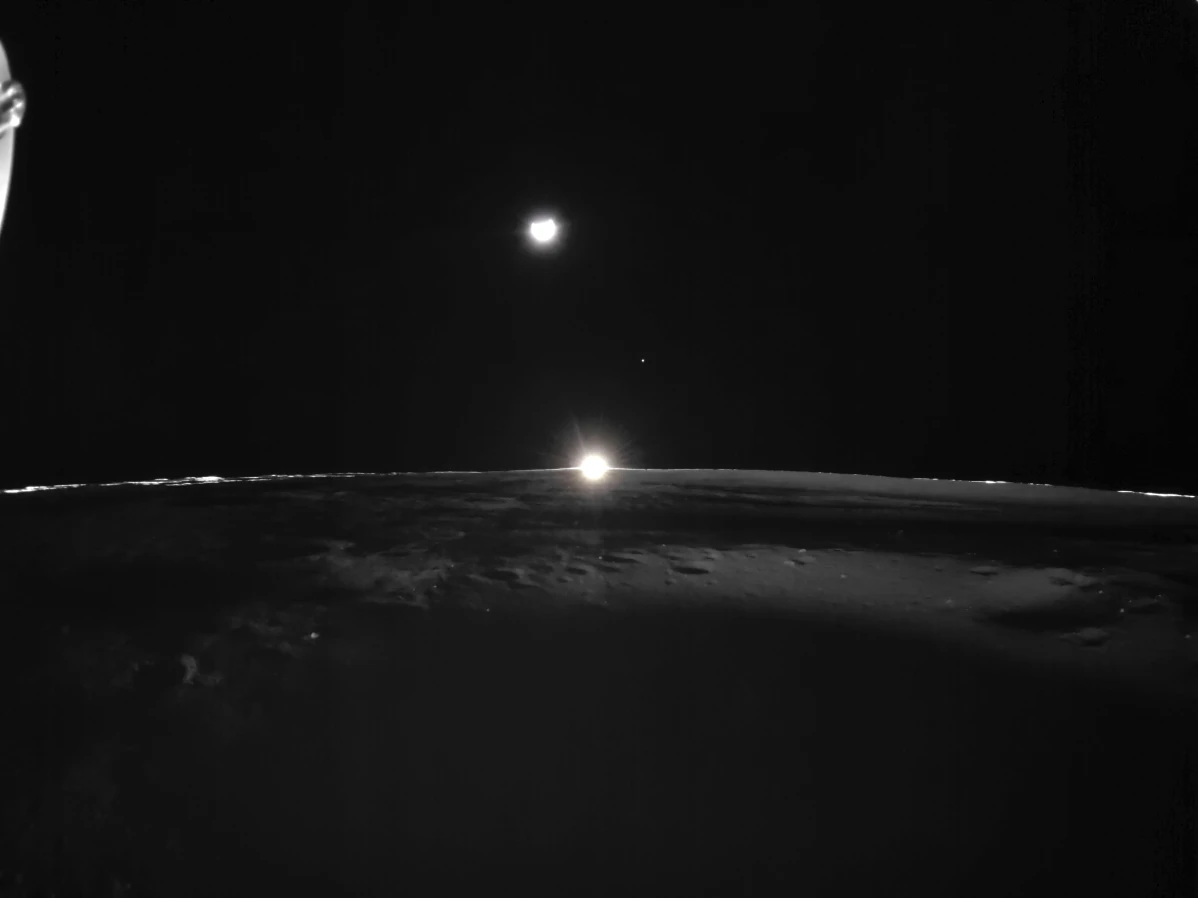
Sunset on the Moon, with crescent Earth and Venus in between, viewed by Blue Ghost

While the Sun moves across the Moon's sky within fourteen days, the daytime of a lunar day or the lunar month, Earth is only visible on the Moon's near side and moves around a central point in the near side's sky.

This is due to the Moon always facing the Earth with the same side, a result of the Moon's rotation being tidally locked to Earth. That said, the Earth does move around slightly around a central point in the Moon's sky, because of monthly libration. Therefore rising or setting of Earth at the horizon on the Moon occurs only at few lunar locations and only to a small degree, at the border of the near side of the Moon to the far side, and takes much longer than a sunrise or sunset on Earth due to the Moon's slow monthly rotation.

The famous Earthrise image by Apollo 8 though is an instance where the astronauts moved around the Moon, causing the Earth to rise above the Moon because of that motion.

=== Earthshine (near side night) ===
Earthshine is the light reflected from the Sun reflected by Earth.

Earthshine is in the lunar night about 43 times brighter, and sometimes even 55 times brighter than a night on Earth illuminated by the light of the full moon. Only on the far side and during lunar eclipses on the near side does the night become dark (and darker than a moonless night on Earth). No person has yet been on the Moon during its night and experienced earthshine.

=== Eclipses from the Moon ===
When sometimes the Moon, Earth and the Sun align exactly in a straight line (a syzygy), the Moon or Earth move through the other's shadow, producing an eclipse for an observer on the surface in the shadow.

When the Moon moves into Earth's shadow a Solar eclipse occurs on the near side of the Moon (which is observable as a Lunar eclipse facing the Moon). Since the apparent diameter of the Earth is four times larger than that of the Sun, the Sun would be hidden behind the Earth for hours. Earth's atmosphere would be visible as a reddish ring. During the Apollo 15 mission, an attempt was made to use the Lunar Roving Vehicle's TV camera to view such an eclipse, but the camera or its power source failed after the astronauts left for Earth.

When Earth moves into the Moon's shadow a Solar eclipse occurs on Earth where the Moon's shadow passes, and is visible facing Earth as a tapered out lunar shadow on Earth's surface traveling across the full Earth's disk. The effect would be comparable to the shadow of a golf ball cast by sunlight on an object 5 m (16 ft) away. Lunar observers with telescopes might be able to discern the umbral shadow as a black spot at the center of a less dark region (penumbra). It would look essentially the same as it does to the Deep Space Climate Observatory, which orbits Earth at the L1 Lagrangian point in the Sun-Earth system, 1.5 million km (0.93 million mi) from Earth.

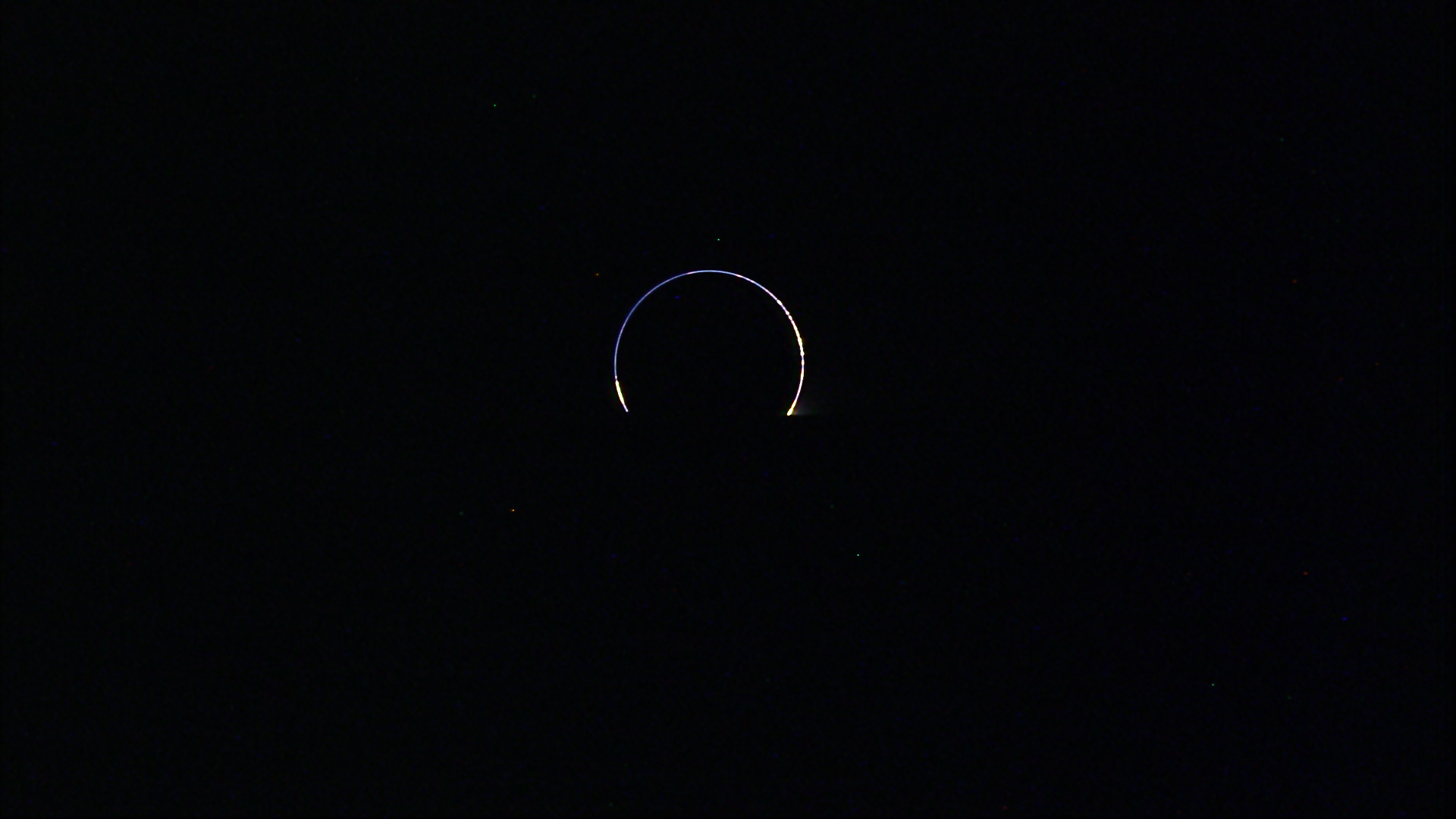
SELENE lunar probe observing a lunar eclipse from the Moon.

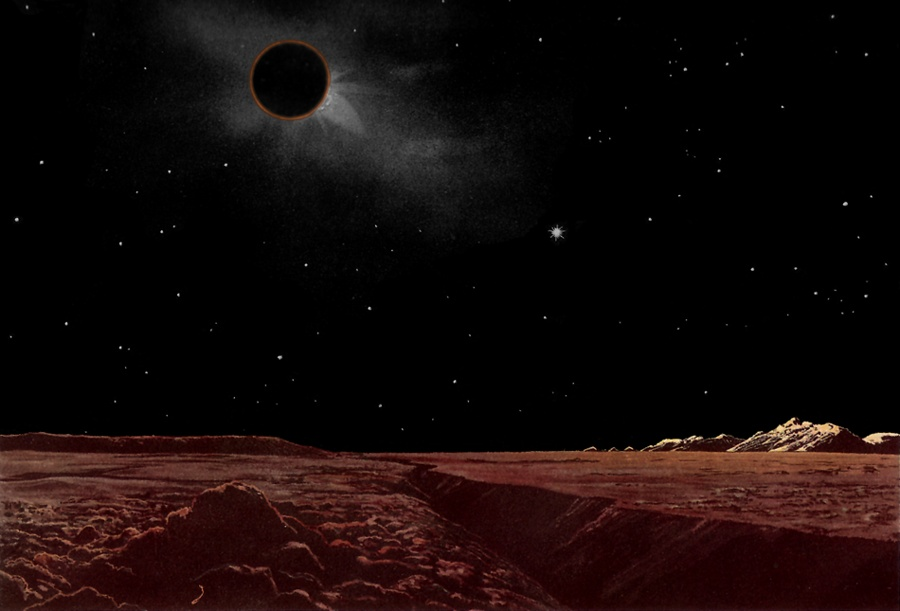
A painting by Lucien Rudaux showing how a lunar eclipse might appear when viewed from the lunar surface.

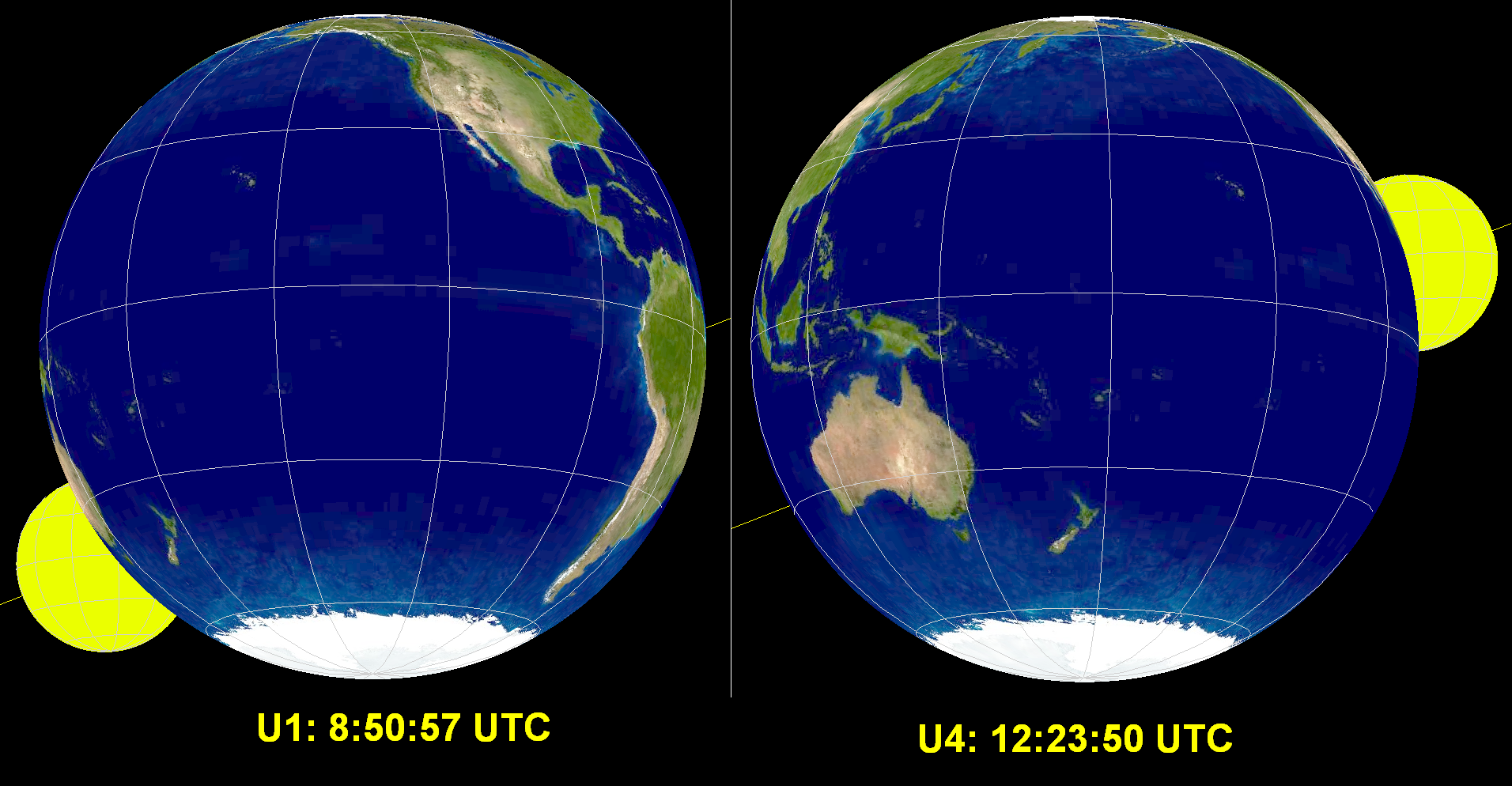
A simulation of the start and end of the August 28, 2007 lunar eclipse, viewed from the center of the Moon.

From space, the Moon's shadow during the solar eclipse of March 9, 2016 appears as a dark spot moving across the Earth.

Solar eclipse from cislunar space, with Earthshine illuminating parts of the Moon, and possibly either or both the solar corona and the zodiacal light are visible as a spiking glow around the Moon.

== Interplanetary space ==
=== Zodiacal light ===
Two false dawns, gegenschein (middle) and the rest of the zodiacal band of light and zodiac marked (visually crossed by the Milky Way), in this composite image of the night sky above the Northern and Southern Hemisphere

The zodiacal light (also called false dawn when seen before sunrise) is a faint glow of diffuse sunlight scattered by interplanetary dust. Brighter around the Sun, it appears in a particularly dark night sky to extend from the Sun's direction in a roughly triangular shape along the zodiac, and appears with less intensity and visibility along the whole ecliptic as the zodiacal band. Zodiacal light spans the entire sky and contributes to the natural light of a clear and moonless night sky. A related phenomenon is gegenschein (or counterglow), sunlight backscattered from the interplanetary dust, which appears directly opposite to the Sun as a faint but slightly brighter oval glow.

Zodiacal light contributes to the natural light of the sky, though since zodiacal light is very faint, it is often outshone and rendered invisible by moonlight or light pollution.

The interplanetary dust in the Solar System forms a thick, pancake-shaped cloud called the zodiacal cloud which straddles the ecliptic plane. The particle sizes range from 10 to 300 micrometres, implying masses from one nanogram to tens of micrograms.

The Pioneer 10 and Helios spacecraft observations in the 1970s revealed zodiacal light to be scattered by the interplanetary dust cloud in the Solar System. Analysis of images of impact debris from the Juno spacecraft shows that the distribution of the dust extends from Earth's orbit to the 4:1 orbital resonance with Jupiter at 2.06 AU, and suggests that the dust is from Mars. However, no other dedicated dust instrumentation on Pioneer 10, Pioneer 11, Galileo, Ulysses, or Cassini found an indication that Mars is a significant source of dust besides comets and asteroids.

=== Earth from deep space ===
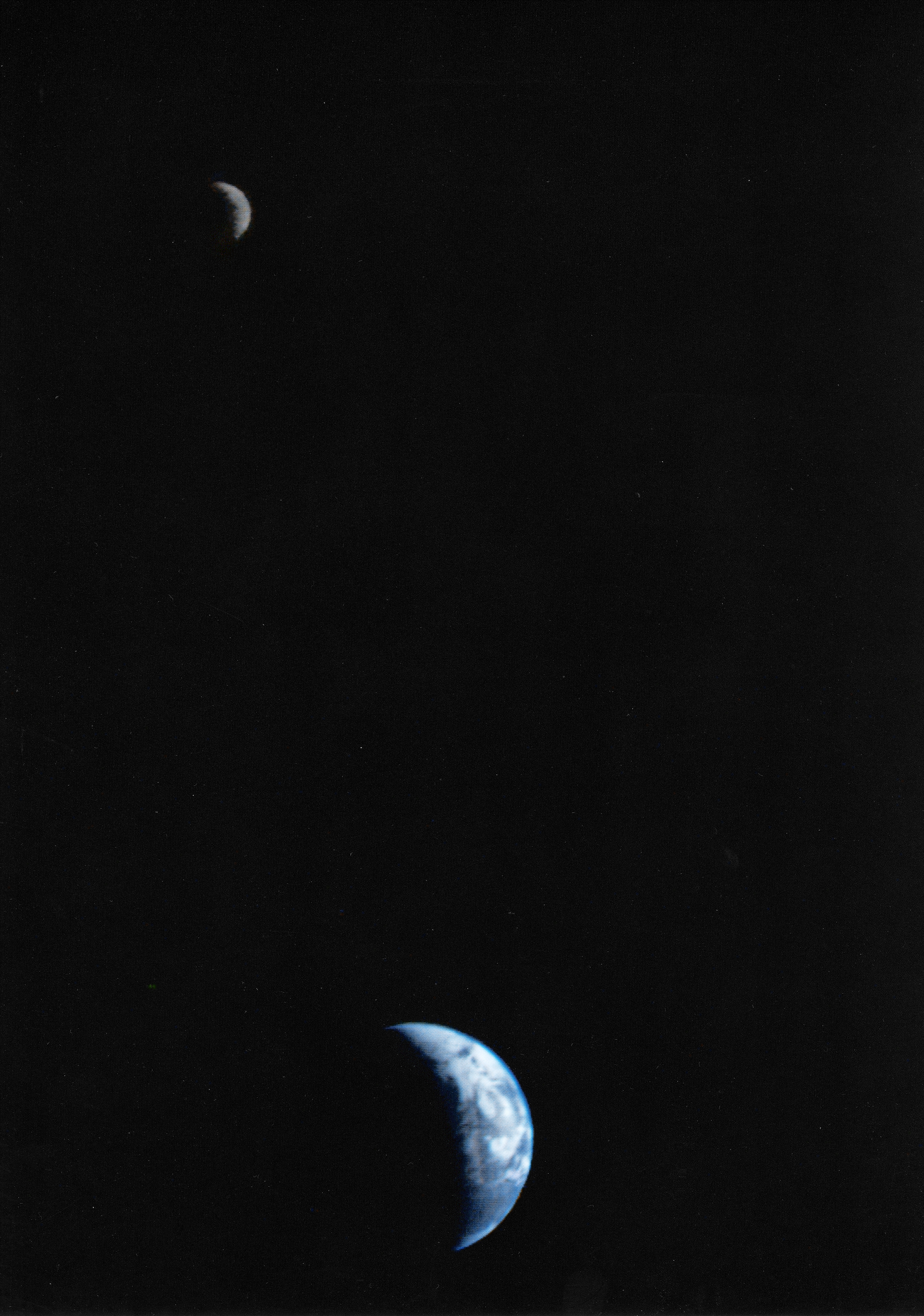
First image of Earth and the Moon in a single frame, by Voyager 1 leaving Earth (1977)

==== Pale Blue Dot ====
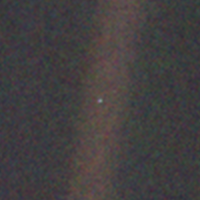
The Earth from beyond the planets of the Solar System as a Pale Blue Dot, which is the name of the iconic photo that this cropped image is of, taken by Voyager 1

Earth appears as a blue dot in the photograph primarily because of Rayleigh scattering of sunlight in its atmosphere. In Earth's air, short-wavelength visible light such as blue light is scattered to a greater extent than longer wavelength light such as red light, which is the reason why the sky appears blue from Earth. (The ocean also contributes to Earth's blueness, but to a lesser degree than scattering.) Earth is a pale blue dot, rather than dark blue, because white light reflected by clouds combines with the scattered blue light.

Earth's reflectance spectrum from the far-ultraviolet to the near-infrared is unlike that of any other observed planet and is partially due to the presence of life on Earth. Rayleigh scattering, which causes Earth's blueness, is enhanced in an atmosphere that does not substantially absorb visible light, unlike, for example, the orange-brown color of Titan, where organic haze particles absorb strongly at blue visible wavelengths. Earth's plentiful atmospheric oxygen, which is produced by photosynthetic life forms, oxidizes organics in the atmosphere and converts them to water and carbon dioxide, causing the atmosphere to be transparent to visible light and allowing for substantial Rayleigh scattering and hence stronger reflectance of blue light.

==== Family Portrait ====
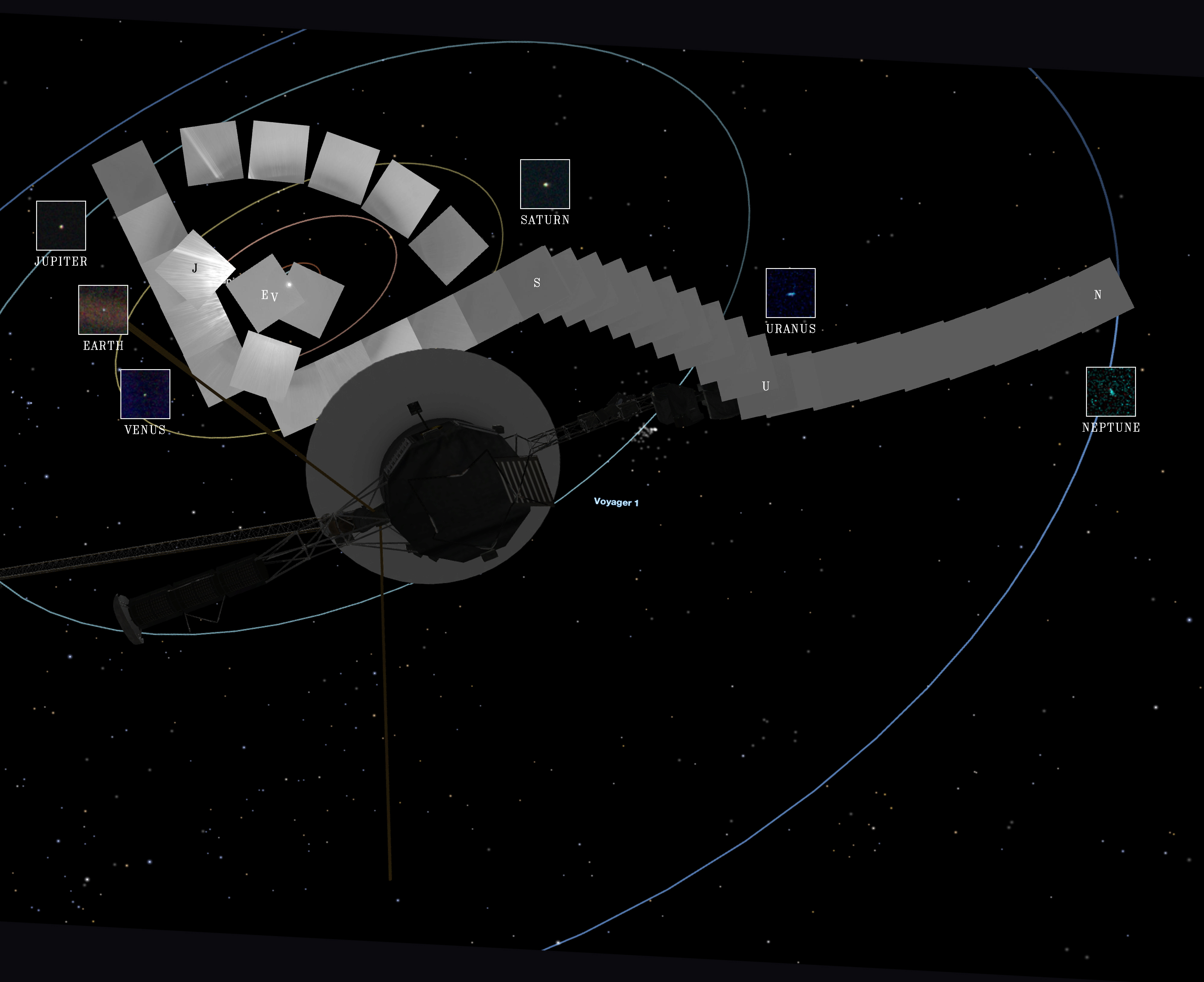
Diagram of the Family Portrait showing the planets of the Solar System, with their orbits added and the relative position of Voyager 1 when the mosaic was captured.

The whole Solar System has been observed by probes leaving the planetary system. One of them, Voyager 1 took the first images of the planets from such a vantage point.

== Mars ==
Mars has only a thin atmosphere; however, it is extremely dusty and there is much light that is scattered about. The sky is thus rather bright during the daytime and stars are not visible. The Martian northern pole star is Deneb, although the actual pole is somewhat offset in the direction of Alpha Cephei; it is more accurate to state that the top two stars of the Northern Cross, Sadr and Deneb, point to the north Celestial pole of Mars. Kappa Velorum is only a couple of degrees from the south Celestial pole of Mars.

=== The moons of Mars ===
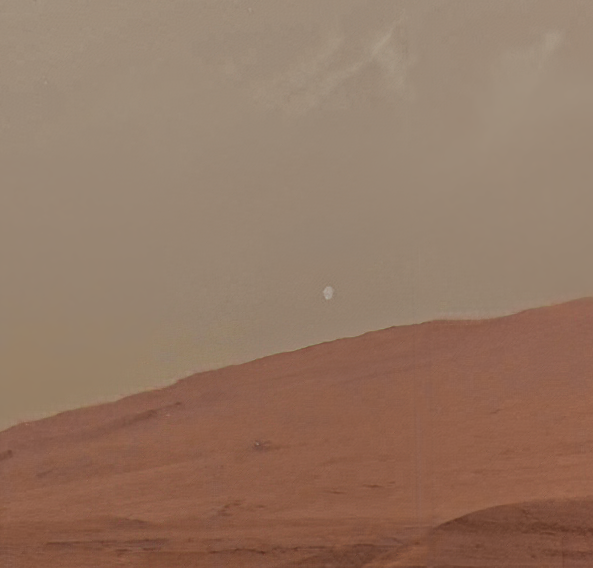
Phobos over Mars captured by the Curiosity rover

Phobos appears in the sky of Mars with an angular size of 4.1′, making its shape recognizable, appearing larger than Venus in Earth's sky, while the Moon appears in Earth's sky as large as 31′ on average.

=== The color of the Martian sky ===
Generating accurate true-color images from Mars' surface is surprisingly complicated. To give but one aspect to consider, there is the Purkinje effect: the human eye's response to color depends on the level of ambient light; red objects appear to darken faster than blue objects as the level of illumination goes down. There is much variation in the color of the sky as reproduced in published images, since many of those images have used filters to maximize their scientific value and are not trying to show true color. For many years, the sky on Mars was thought to be more pinkish than it is now believed to be.

It is now known that during the Martian day, the sky is a butterscotch color. Around sunset and sunrise, the sky is rose in color, but in the vicinity of the setting Sun it is blue. This is the opposite of the situation on Earth. Twilight lasts a long time after the Sun has set and before it rises because of the dust high in Mars's atmosphere.

On Mars, Rayleigh scattering is usually a very weak effect; the red color of the sky is caused by the presence of iron(III) oxide in the airborne dust particles. These particles are larger in size than gas molecules, so most of the light is scattered by Mie scattering. Dust absorbs blue light and scatters longer wavelengths (red, orange, yellow).

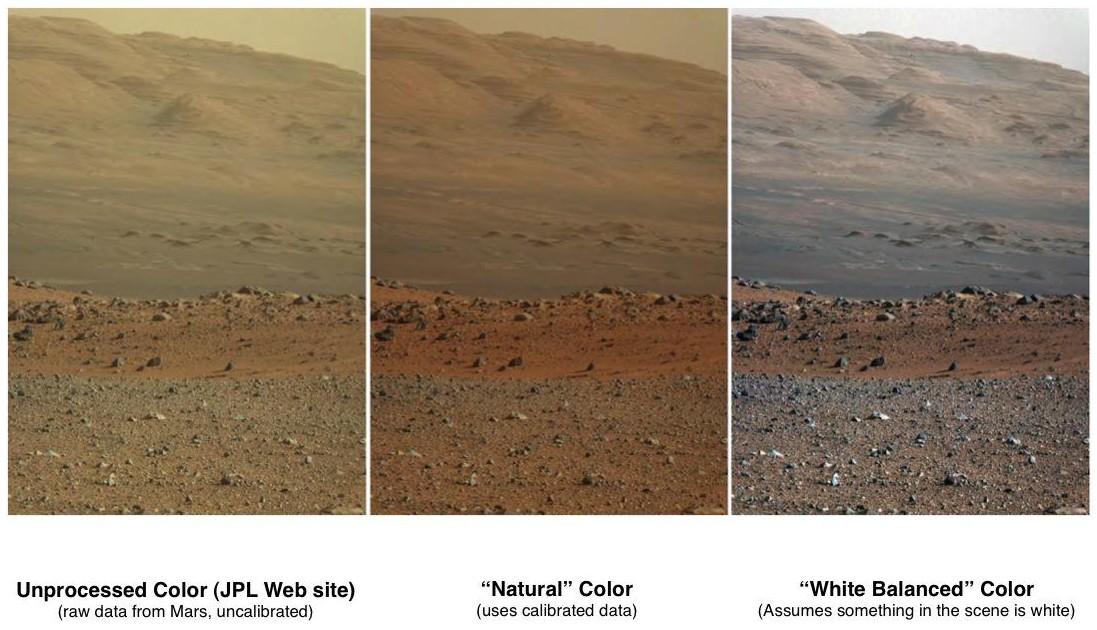
Comparison of color versions (raw, natural, white balance) of Mount Sharp (Aeolis Mons) on Mars

Sunset, Gale crater – photo sequence by Curiosity rover, April 15, 2015

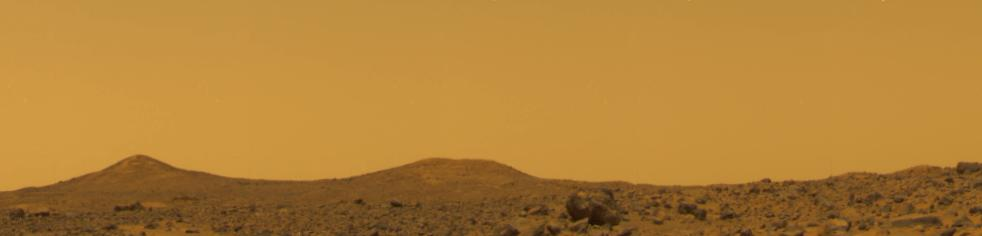
Mars sky at noon, as imaged by Mars Pathfinder (June 1999)

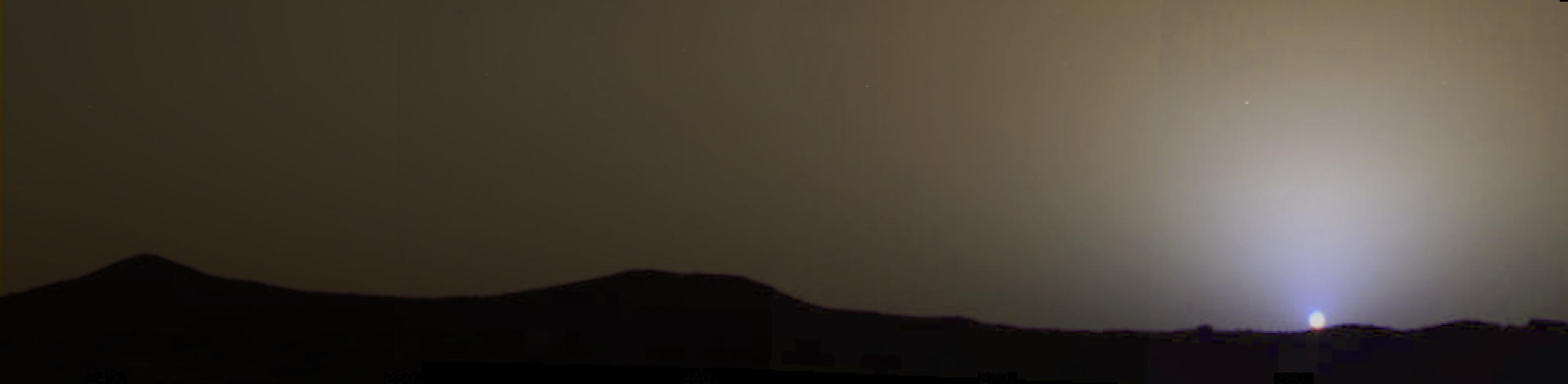
Mars sky at sunset, as imaged by Mars Pathfinder (June 1999)

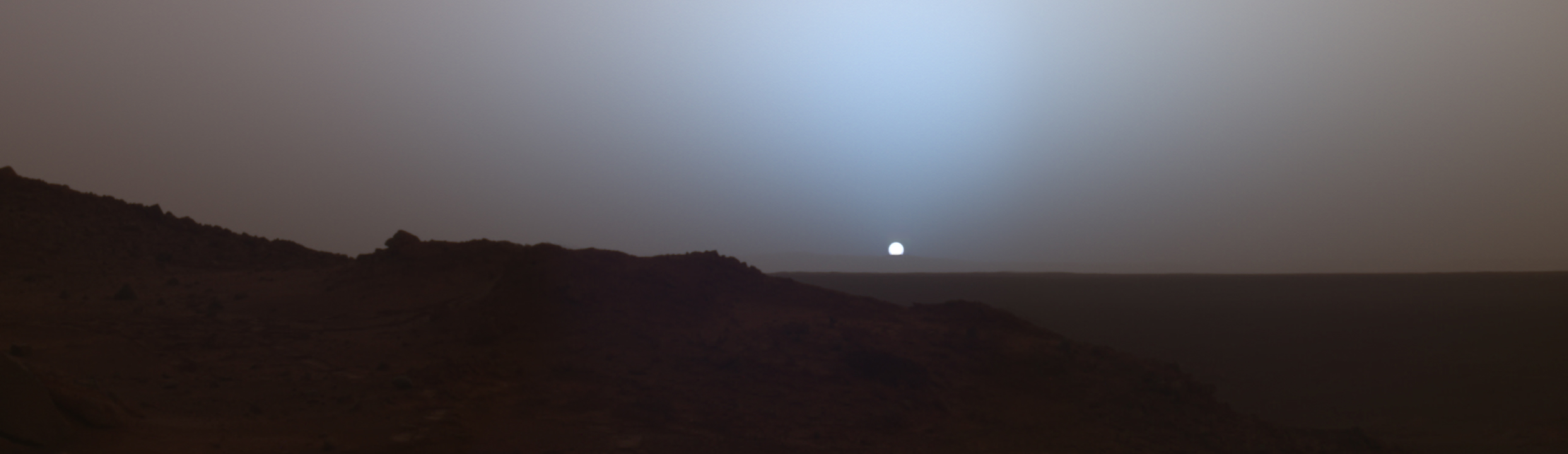
Mars sky at sunset, as imaged by the Spirit rover (May 2005)

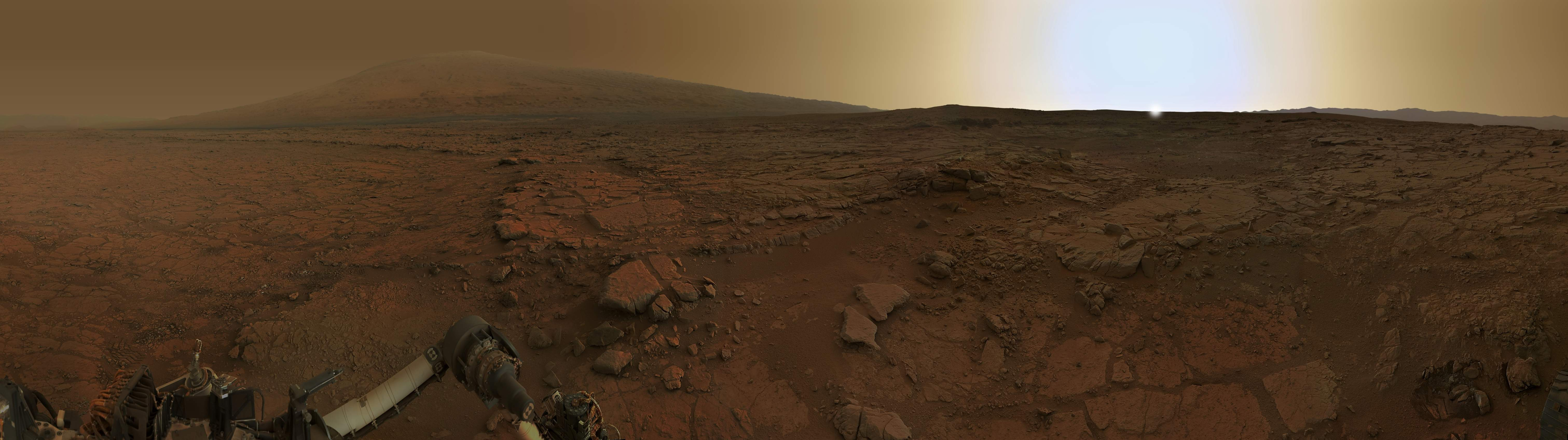
Mars sky at sunset, as imaged by the Curiosity rover (February 2013; Sun simulated by artist)

=== The Sun from Mars ===
The Sun as seen from Mars appears to be 5/8 the angular diameter as seen from Earth (0.35°), and sends 40% of the light, approximately the brightness of a slightly cloudy afternoon on Earth.

On June 3, 2014, the Curiosity rover on Mars observed the planet Mercury transiting the Sun, marking the first time a planetary transit has been observed from a celestial body besides Earth.

=== Earth and Moon from Mars ===
The Earth is visible from Mars as a double star; the Moon would be visible alongside it as a fainter companion. The difference in brightness between the two would be greatest around inferior conjunction. At that time, both bodies would present their dark sides to Mars, but Earth's atmosphere would largely offset this by refracting sunlight much like the atmosphere of Venus does. On the other hand, the airless Moon would behave like the similarly airless Mercury, going completely dark when within a few degrees of the Sun. At inferior conjunction (for the terrestrial observer, this is the opposition of Mars and the Sun), the maximum visible distance between the Earth and the Moon would be about 25′, which is close to the apparent size of the Moon in Earth's sky. The angular size of Earth is between 48.1″ and 6.6″ and of the Moon between 13.3″ and 1.7″, comparable to that of Venus and Mercury from Earth. Near maximum elongation (47.4°), the Earth and Moon would shine at apparent magnitudes −2.5 and +0.9, respectively, comparable to the brightness of Jupiter and Mars in Earth's sky.

Year	Event	Image	Refs
2003	Earth and Moon, imaged by Mars Global Surveyor from its orbit around Mars on May 8, 2003, 13:00 UTC. South America is visible.		
2014	Curiosity's first view of the Earth and the Moon from the surface of Mars (January 31, 2014).		
2016	Earth and the Moon as viewed from orbit around Mars (MRO; HiRISE; November 20, 2016)		
2023	Timelapse of the Moon orbiting Earth as viewed from orbit around Mars (Mars Express; 15, 21, 27 May and 2 June 2023)		
2024	Phobos and Earth in the distance, from the Martian surface		

=== Venus from Mars ===
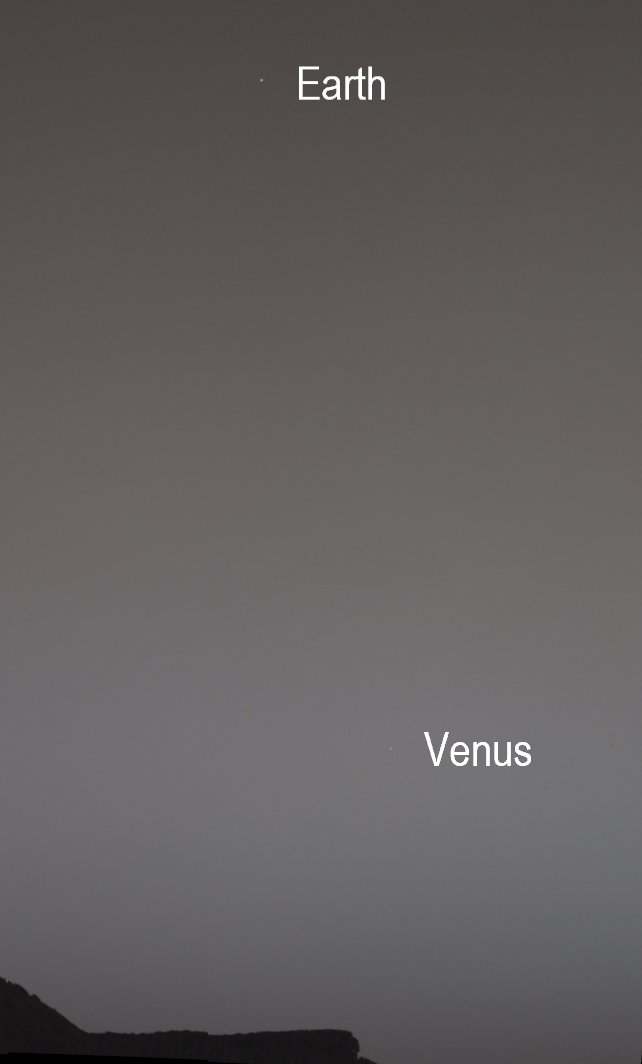
Curiosity views Earth & Venus (5 June 2020)

Venus as seen from Mars (when near the maximum elongation from the Sun of 31.7°) would have an apparent magnitude of about −3.2.

== Jupiter ==
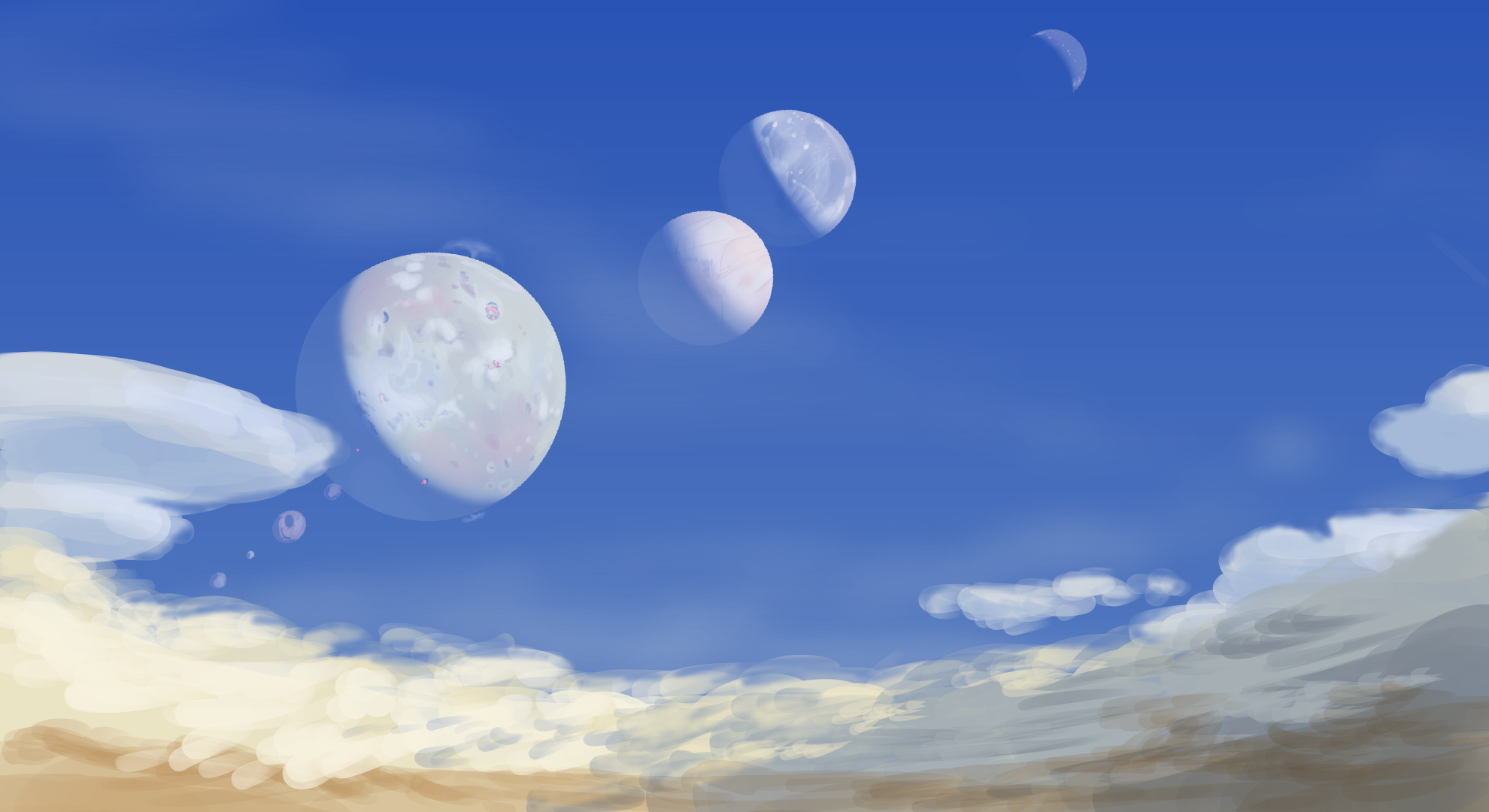
Artist's impression of Jupiter's inner eight moons as seen from its cloud tops. Exaggerated scale.

Although no images from within Jupiter's atmosphere have ever been taken, artistic representations typically assume that the planet's sky is blue, though dimmer than Earth's, because the sunlight there is on average 27 times fainter, at least in the upper reaches of the atmosphere. The planet's narrow rings might be faintly visible from latitudes above the equator. Further down into the atmosphere, the Sun would be obscured by clouds and haze of various colors, most commonly blue, brown, and red. Although theories abound on the cause of the colors, there is currently no unambiguous answer.

From Jupiter, the Sun appears to cover only 5 arcminutes, less than a quarter of its size as seen from Earth. The north pole of Jupiter is a little over two degrees away from Zeta Draconis, while its south pole is about two degrees north of Delta Doradus.

=== Jupiter's moons as seen from Jupiter ===
Aside from the Sun, the most prominent objects in Jupiter's sky are the four Galilean moons. Io, the nearest to the planet, would be slightly larger than the full moon in Earth's sky, though less bright, and would be the largest moon in the Solar System as seen from its parent planet. The higher albedo of Europa would not overcome its greater distance from Jupiter, so it would not outshine Io. In fact, the low solar constant at Jupiter's distance (3.7% Earth's) ensures that none of the Galilean satellites would be as bright as the full moon is on Earth, and neither would any other moon in the Solar System.

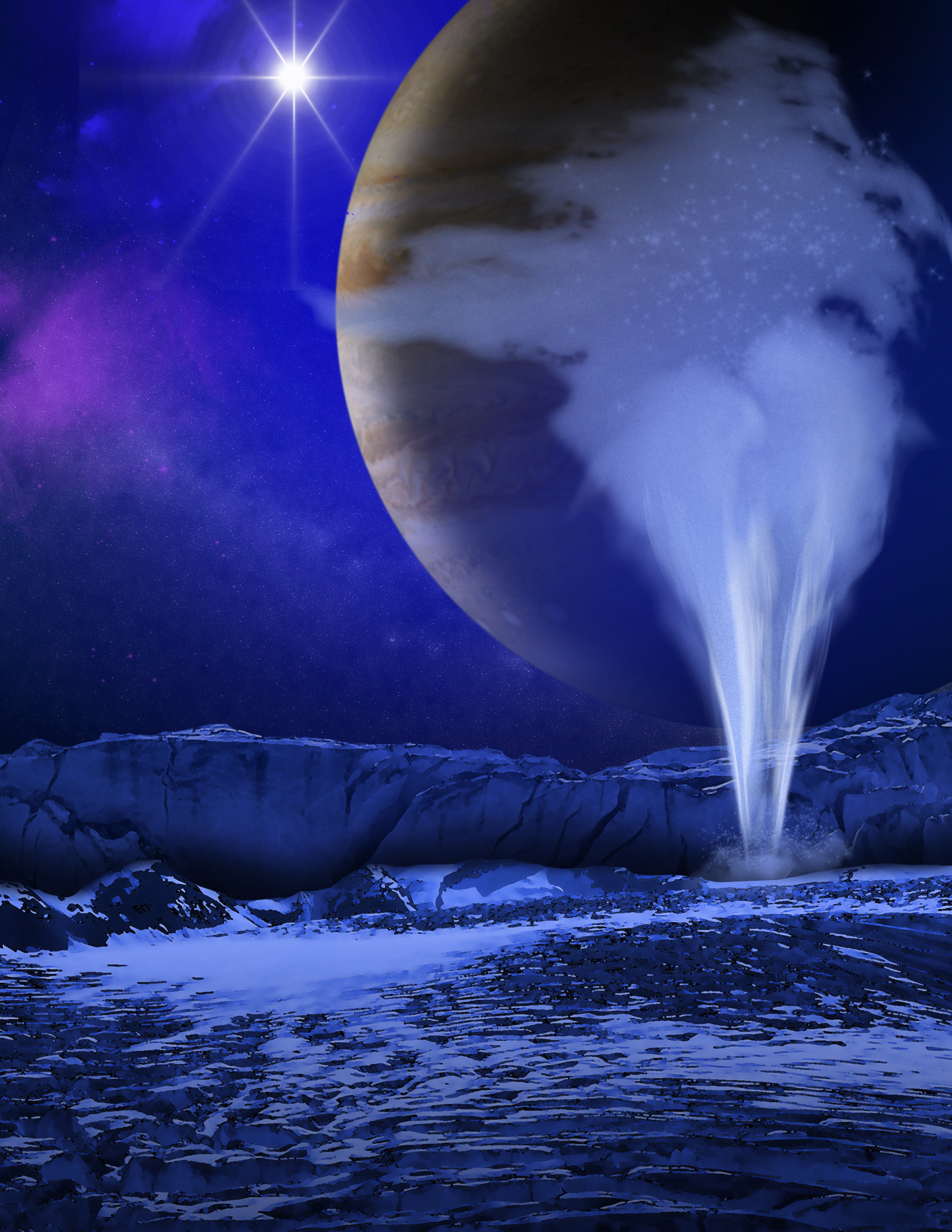
Water vapor plume on Europa (artist concept; December 12, 2013)

All four Galilean moons stand out because of the swiftness of their motion, compared to the Moon. They are all also large enough to fully eclipse the Sun. Because Jupiter's axial tilt is minimal, and the Galilean moons all orbit in the plane of Jupiter's equator, solar eclipses are quite common.

=== The skies of Jupiter's moons ===
None of Jupiter's moons have more than traces of atmosphere, so their skies are very nearly black. For an observer on one of the moons, the most prominent feature of the sky by far would be Jupiter. For an observer on Io, the closest large moon to the planet, Jupiter's apparent diameter would be about 20° (38 times the visible diameter of the Moon, covering 5% of Io's sky). An observer on Metis, the innermost moon, would see Jupiter's apparent diameter increased to 68° (130 times the visible diameter of the Moon, covering 18% of Metis's sky). A "full Jupiter" over Metis shines with about 4% of the Sun's brightness (light on Earth from a full moon is 400,000 times dimmer than sunlight).

Because the inner moons of Jupiter are in synchronous rotation around Jupiter, the planet always appears in nearly the same spot in their skies (Jupiter would wiggle a bit because of the non-zero eccentricities). Observers on the sides of the Galilean satellites facing away from the planet would never see Jupiter, for instance.

From the moons of Jupiter, solar eclipses caused by the Galilean satellites would be spectacular, because an observer would see the circular shadow of the eclipsing moon travel across Jupiter's face.

== Saturn ==
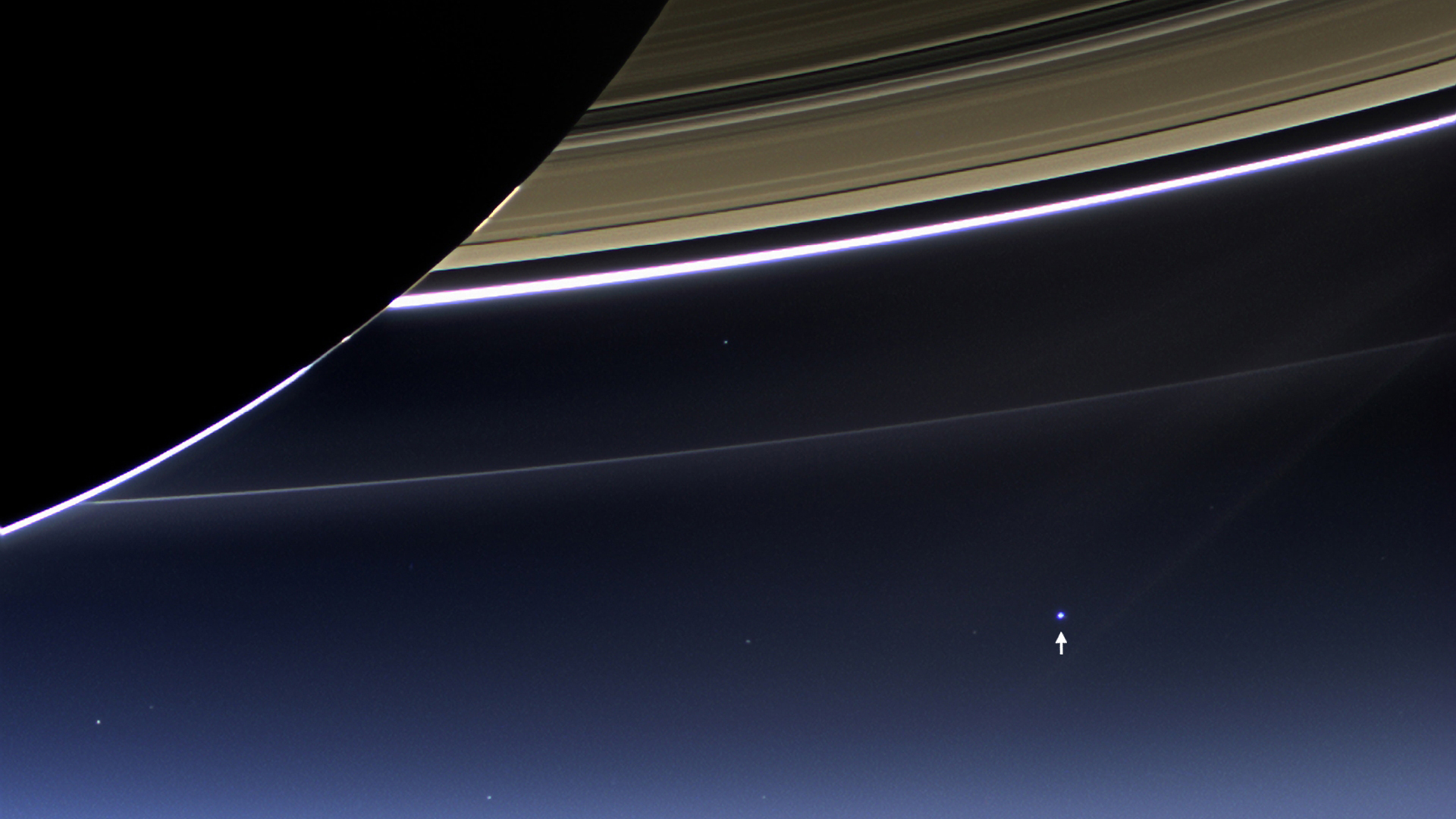
NASA's Cassini spacecraft photographs The Day the Earth Smiled shows the Earth and Moon (bottom-right) from Saturn (July 19, 2013)

The sky in the upper reaches of Saturn's atmosphere is blue (from imagery of the Cassini mission at the time of its September 2017 demise), but the predominant color of its cloud decks suggests that it may be yellowish further down. Observations from spacecraft show that seasonal smog develops in Saturn's southern hemisphere at its perihelion due to its axial tilt. This could cause the sky to become yellowish at times. As the northern hemisphere is pointed towards the Sun only at aphelion, the sky there would likely remain blue. The rings of Saturn are almost certainly visible from the upper reaches of its atmosphere. The rings are so thin that from a position on Saturn's equator, they would be almost invisible. However, from anywhere else on the planet, they could be seen as a spectacular arc stretching across half the celestial hemisphere.

Delta Octantis is the south pole star of Saturn. Its north pole is in the far northern region of Cepheus, about six degrees from Polaris.

=== The sky of Titan ===
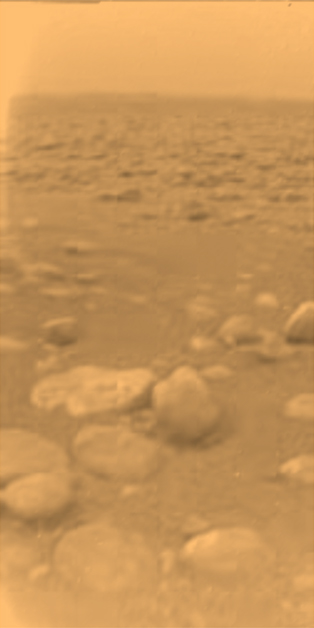
Surface of Titan as viewed by the Huygens probe

Titan is the only moon in the Solar System to have a thick atmosphere. Images from the Huygens probe show that the Titanean sky is a light tangerine color. However, an astronaut standing on the surface of Titan would see a hazy brownish/dark orange color. As a consequence of its greater distance from the Sun and the opacity of its atmosphere, the surface of Titan receives only about 1/3000 of the sunlight Earth does – daytime on Titan is thus only as bright as twilight on the Earth. It seems likely that Saturn is permanently invisible behind orange smog, and even the Sun would be only a lighter patch in the haze, barely illuminating the surface of ice and methane lakes. However, in the upper atmosphere, the sky would have a blue color and Saturn would be visible. With its thick atmosphere and methane rain, Titan is the only celestial body other than Earth upon which rainbows on the surface could form. However, given the extreme opacity of the atmosphere in visible light, the vast majority would be in the infrared.

== Uranus ==
From a vantage above the clouds on Uranus, the sky would probably appear dark blue. It is unlikely that the planet's rings can be seen from the upper atmosphere, as they are very thin and dark. Uranus has a northern polar star, Sabik (η Ophiuchi), a magnitude 2.4 star. Uranus also has a southern polar star, 15 Orionis, a magnitude 4.8 star. Both are fainter than Earth's Polaris (α Ursae Minoris), although Sabik only slightly.

== Neptune ==
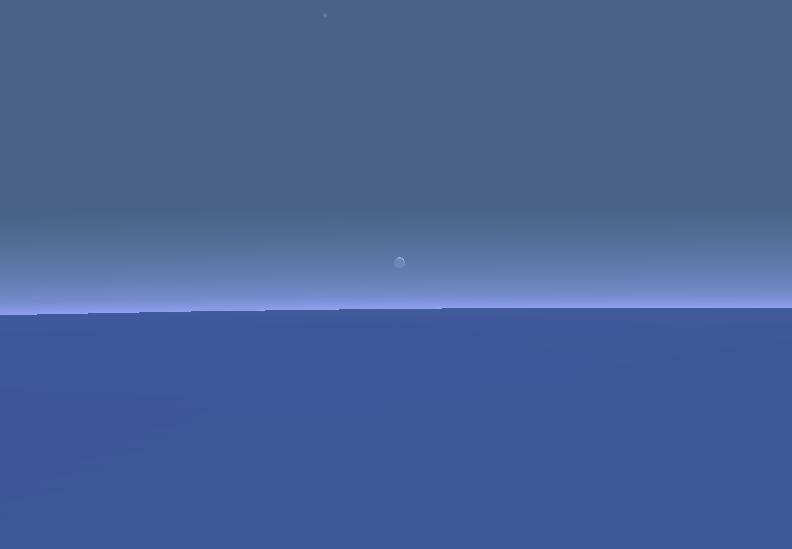
Triton in the sky of Neptune (simulated view)

The north pole of Neptune points to a spot midway between Gamma and Delta Cygni. Its south pole star is Gamma Velorum.

Judging by the color of its atmosphere, the sky of Neptune is probably an azure or sky blue, similar to Uranus's. As in the case of Uranus, it is unlikely that the planet's rings can be seen from the upper atmosphere, as they are very thin and dark.

Aside from the Sun, the most notable object in Neptune's sky is its large moon Triton, which would appear slightly smaller than a full Moon on Earth. It moves more swiftly than the Moon, because of its shorter period (5.8 days) compounded by its retrograde orbit. The smaller moon Proteus would show a disk about half the size of the full Moon. Surprisingly, Neptune's small inner moons all cover, at some point in their orbits, more than 10′ in Neptune's sky. At some points, Despina's angular diameter rivals that of Ariel from Uranus and Ganymede from Jupiter. Here are the angular diameters for Neptune's moons (for comparison, Earth's moon measures on average 31′ for terrestrial observers): Naiad, 7–13′; Thalassa, 8–14′; Despina, 14–22′; Galatea, 13–18′; Larissa, 10–14′; Proteus, 12–16′; Triton, 26–28′. An alignment of the inner moons would likely produce a spectacular sight. Neptune's largest outer satellite, Nereid, is not large enough to appear as a disk from Neptune, and is not noticeable in the sky, as its brightness at full phase varies from magnitude 2.2–6.4, depending on which point in its eccentric orbit it happens to be. The other irregular outer moons would not be visible to the naked eye, although a dedicated telescopic observer could potentially spot some at full phase.

As with Uranus, the low light levels cause the major moons to appear very dim. The brightness of Triton at full phase is only −7.11, despite the fact that Triton is more than four times as intrinsically bright as Earth's moon and orbits much closer to Neptune.

=== The sky of Triton ===
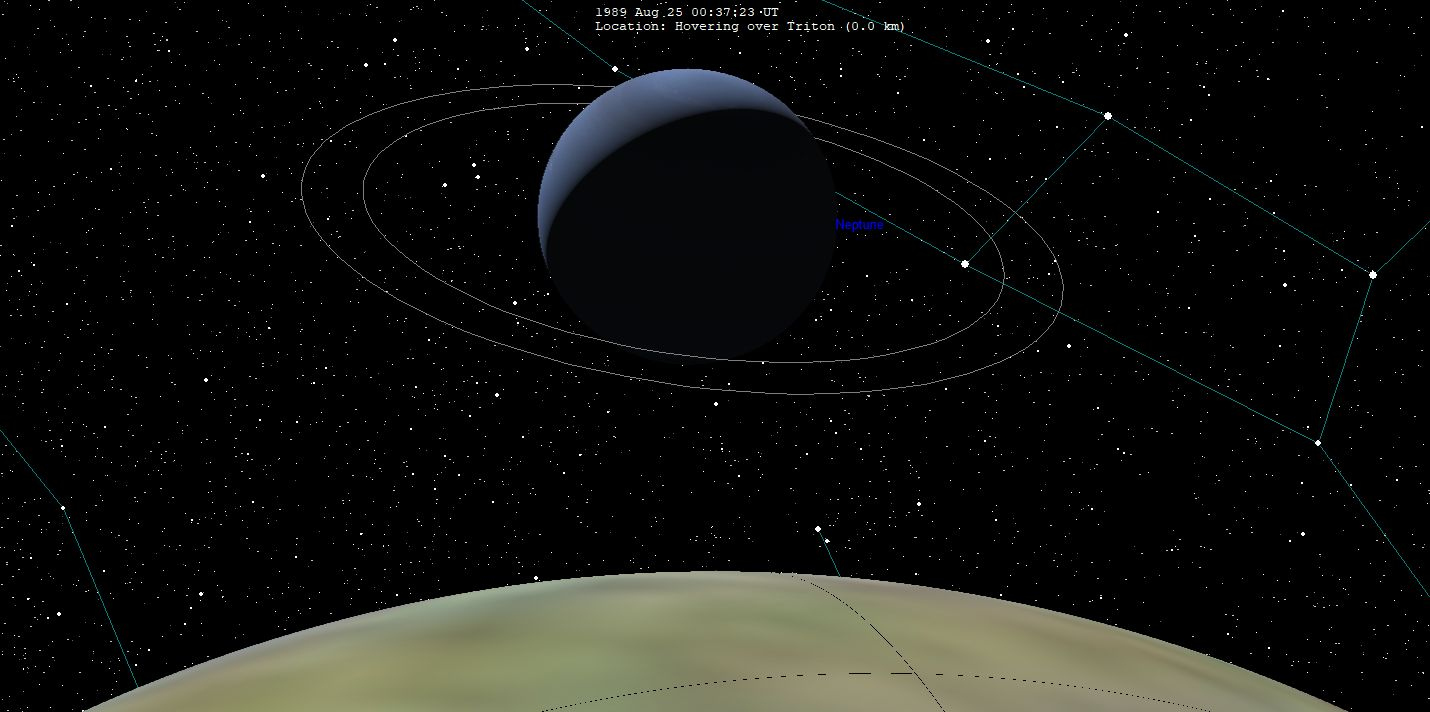
Neptune in the sky of Triton (simulated view)

Triton, Neptune's largest moon, has a hazy atmosphere composed primarily of nitrogen. Because Triton orbits with synchronous rotation, Neptune always appears in the same position in its sky. Triton's rotation axis is inclined 130° to Neptune's orbital plane and thus points within 40° of the Sun twice per Neptunian year, much like Uranus's. As Neptune orbits the Sun, Triton's polar regions take turns facing the Sun for 82 years at a stretch, resulting in radical seasonal changes as one pole, then the other, moves into the sunlight.

Neptune itself would span 8 degrees in Triton's sky, though with a maximum brightness roughly comparable to that of the full moon on Earth it would appear only about 1/256 as bright as the full moon, per unit area. Due to its eccentric orbit, Nereid would vary considerably in brightness, from fifth to first magnitude; its disk would be far too small to see with the naked eye. Proteus would also be difficult to resolve at just 5–6 arcminutes across, but it would never be fainter than first magnitude, and at its closest would rival Canopus.

== Trans-Neptunian objects ==
A trans-Neptunian object is any minor planet in the Solar System that orbits the Sun at a greater average distance (semi-major axis) than Neptune, 30 astronomical units (AU).

=== Pluto and Charon ===
Pluto, accompanied by its largest moon Charon, orbits the Sun at a distance usually outside the orbit of Neptune except for a twenty-year period in each orbit.

From Pluto, the Sun is point-like to human eyes, but still very bright, giving roughly 150 to 450 times the light of the full Moon from Earth (the variability being due to the fact that Pluto's orbit is highly elliptical, stretching from just 4.4 billion km to over 7.3 billion km from the Sun). Nonetheless, human observers would notice a large decrease in available light: the solar illuminance at Pluto's average distance is about 85 lx, which is equivalent to the lighting of an office building's hallway or restroom.

Pluto's atmosphere consists of a thin envelope of nitrogen, methane, and carbon monoxide gases, all of which are derived from the ices of these substances on its surface. When Pluto is close to the Sun, the temperature of Pluto's solid surface increases, causing these ices to sublimate into gases. This atmosphere also produces a noticeable blue haze that is visible at sunset and possibly other times of the Plutonian day.

Pluto and Charon are tidally locked to each other. This means that Charon always presents the same face to Pluto, and Pluto also always presents the same face to Charon. Observers on the far side of Charon from Pluto would never see the dwarf planet; observers on the far side of Pluto from Charon would never see the moon. Every 124 years, for several years it is mutual-eclipse season, during which Pluto and Charon each alternately eclipse the Sun for the other at intervals of 3.2 days. Charon, as seen from Pluto's surface at the sub-Charon point, has an angular diameter of about 3.8°, nearly eight times the Moon's angular diameter as seen from Earth and about 56 times the area. It would be a very large object in the night sky, shining about 8% (Note: Charon's radius is 606 km to the Moon's 1737 (surface ratio 0.12), its albedo is 0.35 to the Moon's 0.14 (2.6 ratio), its semi-major axis is 19591 km to the Moon's 384,400 (385 ratio of illumination), and the Sun is 39.482 times farther (0.00064 ratio of solar illumination). Multiplying these together yields an illuminance 0.077 times the Moon's.) as bright as the Moon (it would appear darker than the Moon because its lesser illumination comes from a larger disc). Charon's illuminance would be about 14 mlx (for comparison, a moonless clear night sky is 2 mlx while a full Moon is between 300 and 50 mlx).

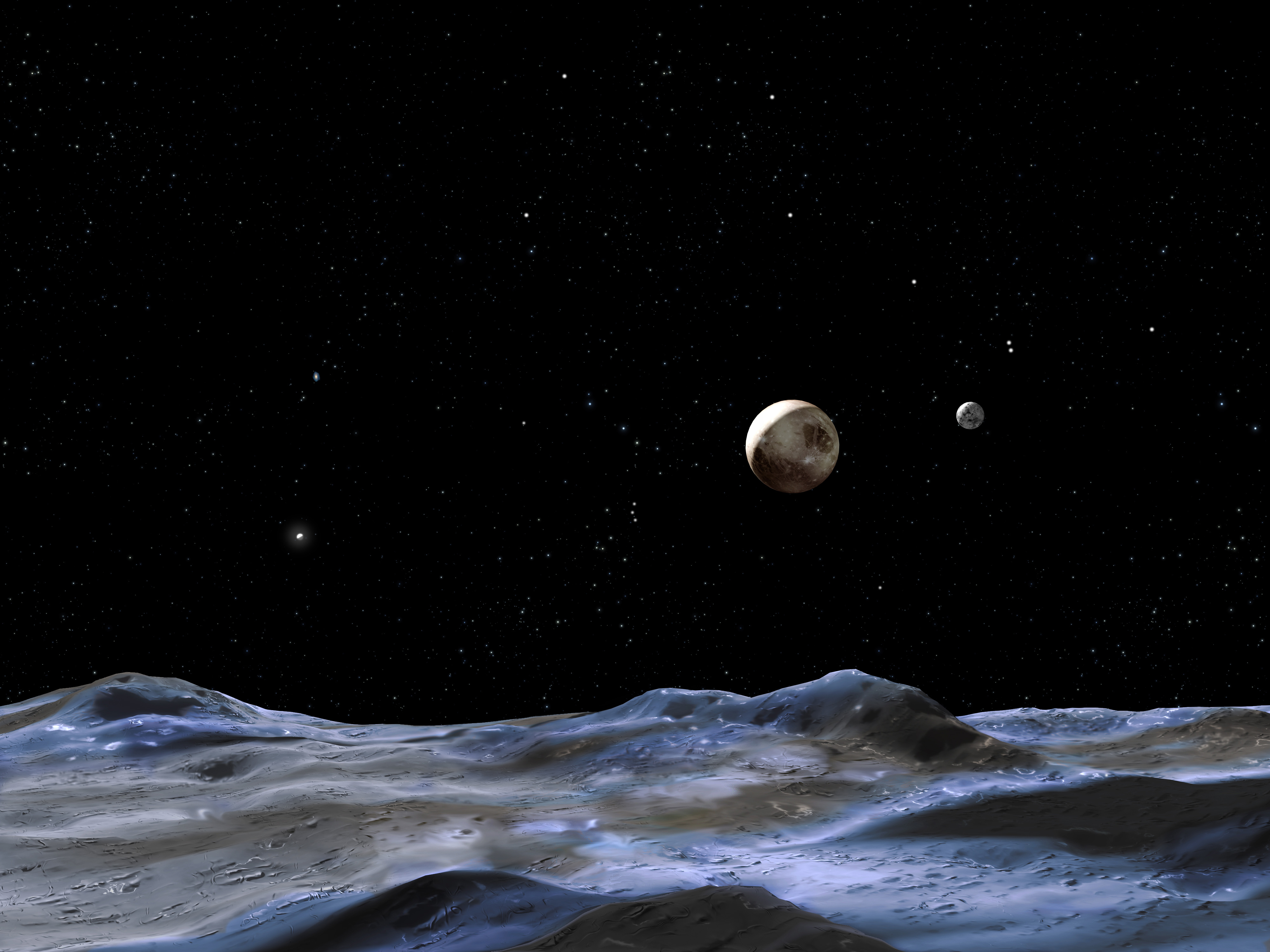
View from Hydra. Pluto and Charon (right); Nix (left) (artist concept).

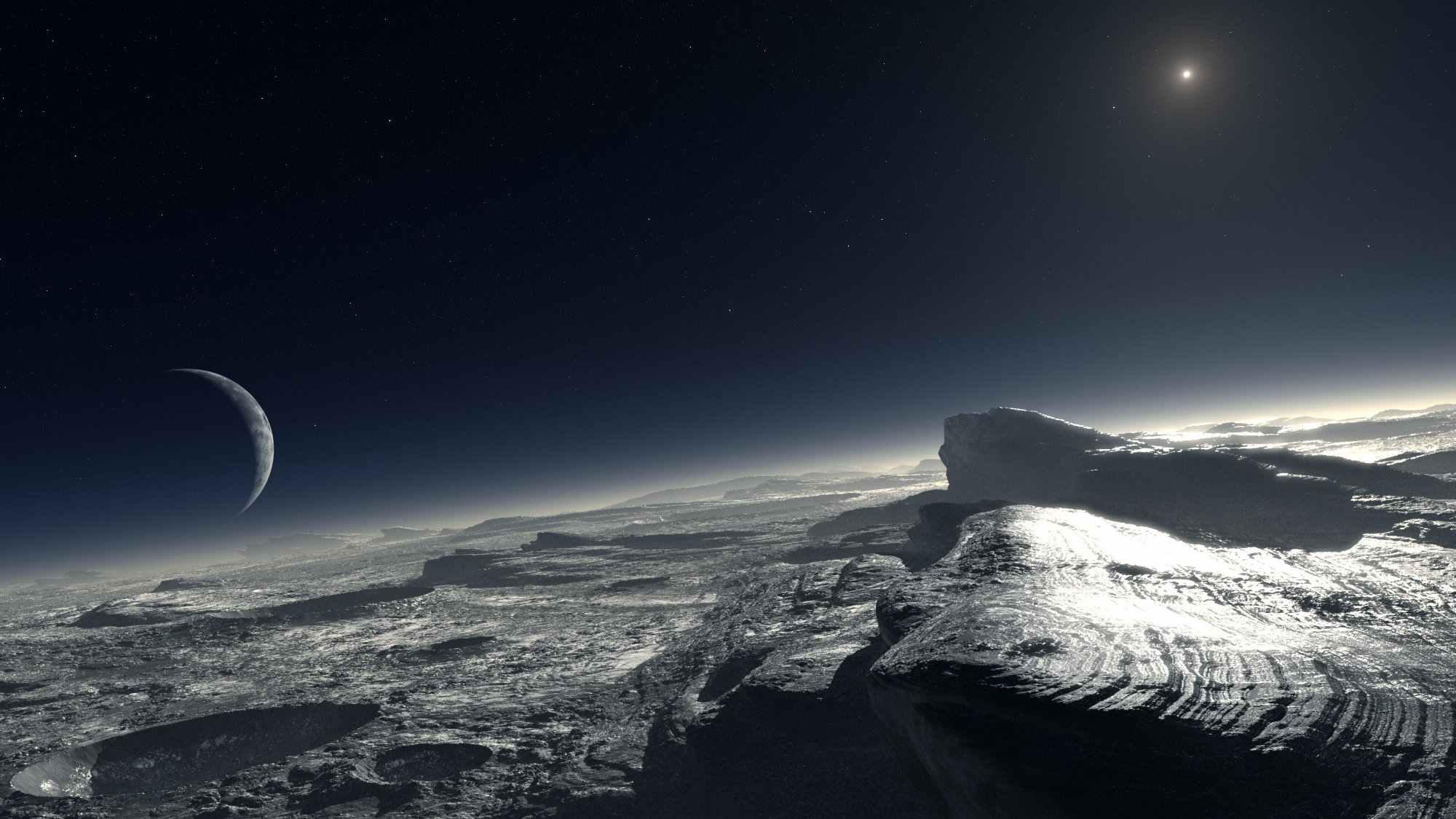
View from Pluto. Sun (right-top); Charon (left) (artist concept).

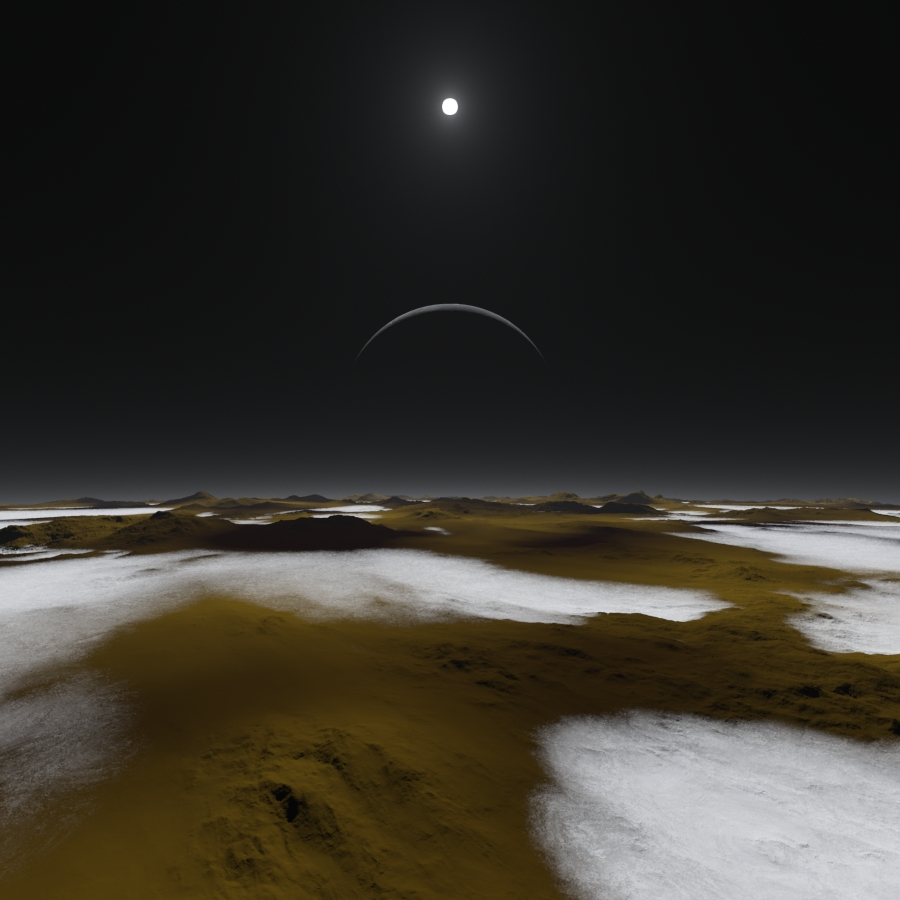
View from Pluto of Charon and the Sun (artist concept).

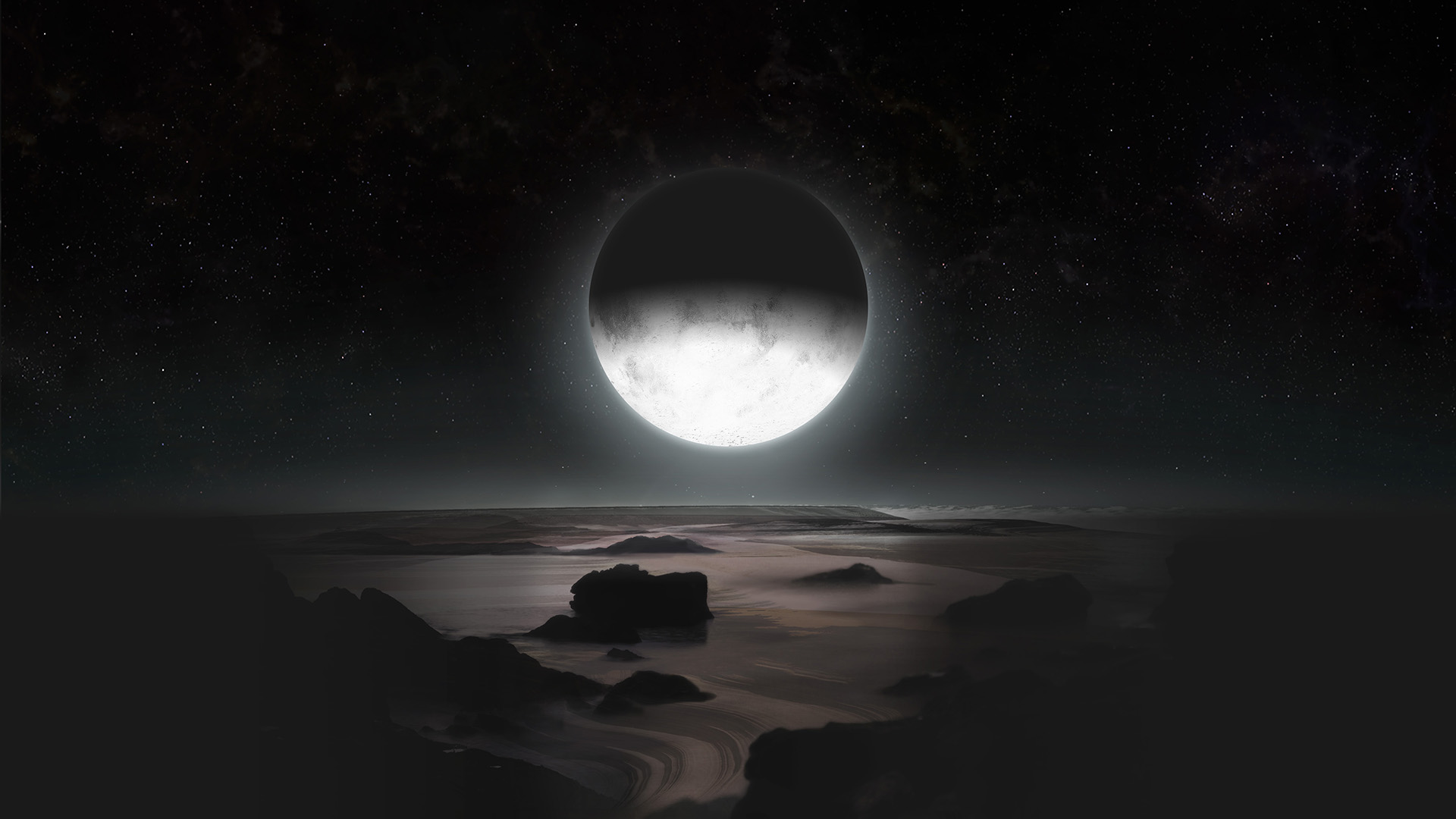
Pluto by moonlight
(artist concept).
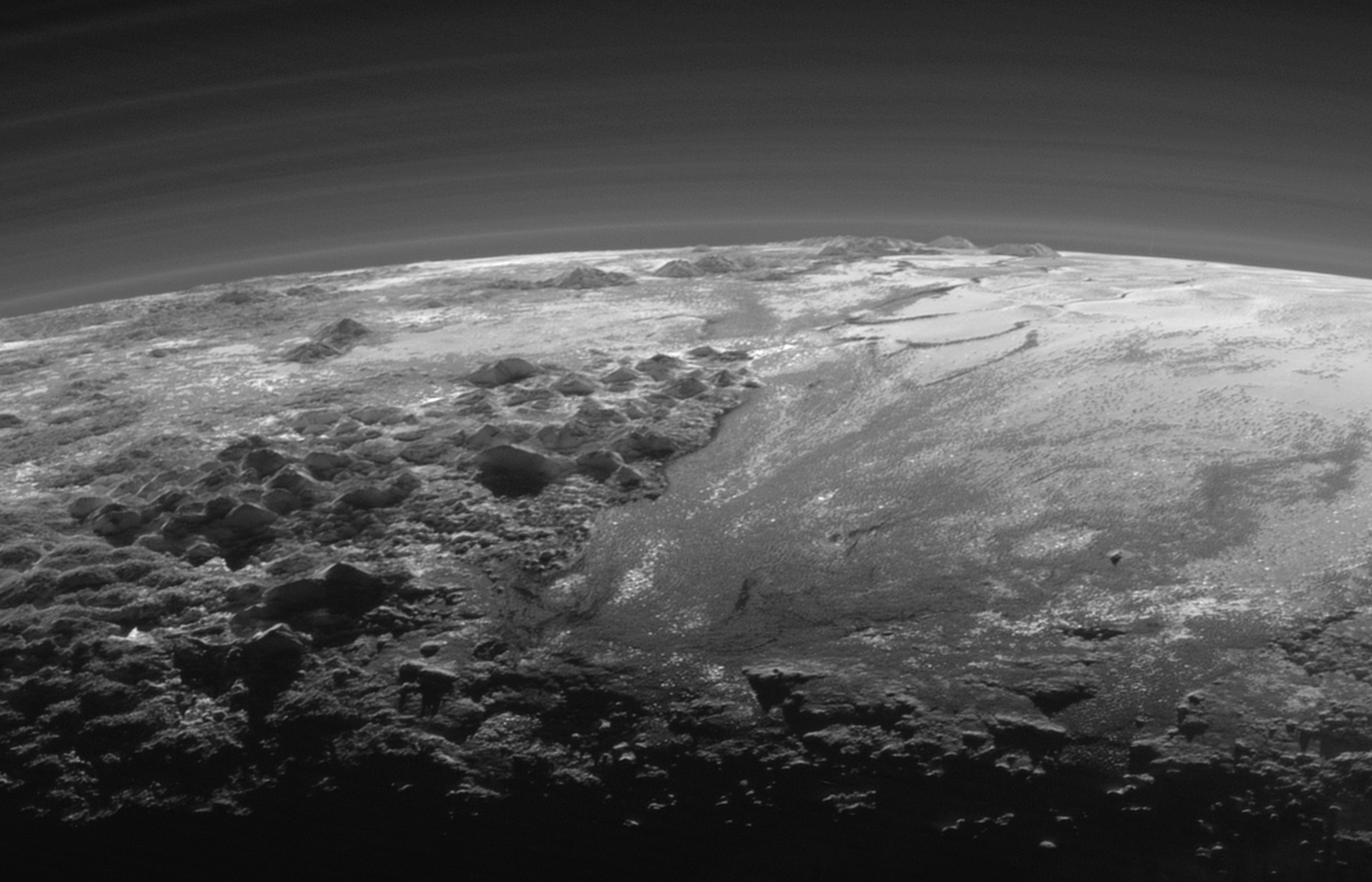
Pluto – Tenzing Montes (left-foreground); Hillary Montes (left-skyline); Sputnik Planitia (right)
Near-sunset view includes several layers of atmospheric haze.

== Extrasolar planets ==
For observers on extrasolar planets, the constellations would differ depending on the distances involved. The view of outer space of exoplanets can be extrapolated from open source software such as Celestia, Stellarium, or SpaceEngine. Due to parallax, distant stars change their position less than nearby ones. For alien observers, the Sun would be visible to the naked human eye only at distances below 20 – 27 parsec (60–90 ly). (Note: These numbers are extrapolated from the fact that the human eye can generally see up to magnitude 6.5 on Earth, while it can see up to magnitude 7 under the best possible conditions.) If the Sun were to be observed from another star, it would always appear on the opposite coordinates in the sky. Thus, an observer located near a star with RA at 4 hr and declination −10 would see the Sun located at RA: 16 hr, dec: +10. A consequence of observing the universe from other stars is that stars that may appear bright in our own sky may appear dimmer in other skies and vice versa.

In May 2017, glints of light from Earth, seen as twinkling by DSCOVR, a satellite stationed roughly a million miles from Earth at the Earth-Sun L1 Lagrange point, were found to be reflected light from ice crystals in the atmosphere. The technology used to determine this may be useful in studying the atmospheres of distant worlds, including those of exoplanets.

The position of stars in extrasolar skies differs the least to the positions in Earth's sky at the closest stars to Earth, with nearby stars shifting position the most. The Sun would appear as a bright star only at the closest stars. At the Alpha Centauri star system the Sun would appear as a bright star continuing the wavy line of Cassiopeia eastward, while Sirius would shift to a position just next to Betelgeuse and its own Proxima Centauri red dwarf would still appear as a dim star contrary to its main A and B stars. At Barnard's Star the Sun would appear between the not much shifted Sirius and Belt of Orion compared to in the sky of Earth. Conversely the Sun would appear from Sirius and also Procyon around Altair.

Planets of the TRAPPIST-1 system orbit extremely close together, enough so that each planet of the system would provide a detailed view of the other six. Planets of the TRAPPIST-1 system would appear in the sky with angular diameters comparable to the moon as viewed from Earth. Under clear viewing conditions, details such as phases and surface features would be easily visible to the naked eye.

== From the Large Magellanic Cloud ==
From a viewpoint in the Large Magellanic Cloud, the Milky Way's total apparent magnitude would be −2.0—over 14 times brighter than the LMC appears to us on Earth—and it would span about 36° across the sky, the width of over 70 full moons. Furthermore, because of the LMC's high galactic latitude, an observer there would get an oblique view of the entire galaxy, free from the interference of interstellar dust that makes studying in the Milky Way's plane difficult from Earth. (Note: Some of the figures in the "View" section were extrapolated from data in the Appendix of Chaisson and McMillan's Astronomy Today (Englewood Cliffs: Prentice-Hall, Inc., 1993).) The Small Magellanic Cloud would be about magnitude 0.6, substantially brighter than the LMC appears to us.

== See also ==
- Exosphere
- Overview effect
- Pole star § Other planets
- Sky
- Timeline of first images of Earth from space
