= Eta Doradus =

The Bayer designation Eta Doradus (η Dor / η Doradus) is shared by two stars in the constellation Dorado:

- η^{1} Doradus
- η^{2} Doradus
