= Eta2 Doradus =

Star in the constellation Dorado

Observation data Epoch J2000.0 Equinox ICRS
- Constellation: Dorado
- Right ascension: 06^{h} 11^{m} 14.982^{s}
- Declination: −65° 35′ 21.905″
- Apparent magnitude (V): 5.01

Characteristics
- Evolutionary stage: AGB
- Spectral type: M2.5III
- B−V color index: 1.599

Astrometry
Radial velocity (R_{v})	+34.5±0.8 km/s
Proper motion (μ)	RA: −23.255 mas/yr Dec.: +119.249 mas/yr
Parallax (π)	4.5312±0.1018 mas
Distance	720 ± 20 ly (221 ± 5 pc)
Absolute magnitude (M_{V})	−1.45

Details
Mass	1.4 M_{☉}
Radius	81.89 R_{☉}
Luminosity	1,165 L_{☉}
Surface gravity (log g)	1.61 cgs
Temperature	3,726+313 −154 K
Metallicity [Fe/H]	−0.13 dex

Other designations
- η^{2} Dor, CPD−65°561, FK5 2473, GC 7946, HD 43455, HIP 29353, HR 2245, SAO 249469, PPM 355229, TYC 8901-1098-1

Database references
SIMBAD	data

Eta^{2} Doradus is a star in the southern constellation of Dorado. Its name is a Bayer designation that is Latinized from η^{2} Doradus and abbreviated Eta^{2} Dor or η^{2} Dor. This object is visible to the naked eye as a dim, reddish star with an apparent visual magnitude of 5.01. It is located at a distance of about 720 light years from the Sun as shown by parallax measurements, and its net movement is one of receding, having a radial velocity of +34.5 km/s. It is circumpolar south of latitude 24° 24′ S.

This object is an M-type giant star, with its stellar classification being M2.5III. It has left the main sequence after exhausting its core hydrogen and expanded to around 80 R_{☉}. The star is radiating about 1,200 times the Sun's luminosity from its photosphere, at an effective temperature of 3,726 K.
