= 15 Orionis =

Star system in the constellation Orion

- Location of 15 Orionis (circled)

Observation data Epoch J2000 Equinox ICRS
- Constellation: Orion
- Right ascension: 05^{h} 09^{m} 41.96481^{s}
- Declination: +15° 35′ 49.9051″
- Apparent magnitude (V): 4.82

Characteristics
- Evolutionary stage: giant
- Spectral type: F2IV
- U−B color index: +0.19
- B−V color index: +0.32

Astrometry
Radial velocity (R_{v})	+28.79 km/s
Proper motion (μ)	RA: −3.105 mas/yr Dec.: −3.444 mas/yr
Parallax (π)	9.5097±0.2951 mas
Distance	340 ± 10 ly (105 ± 3 pc)
Absolute magnitude (M_{V})	−0.04

Details

15 Ori A
Mass	3.42±0.67 M_{☉}
Radius	5.9 R_{☉}
Luminosity	300 L_{☉}
Surface gravity (log g)	3.75 cgs
Temperature	7,161+50 −49 K
Metallicity [Fe/H]	+0.21 dex
Rotational velocity (v sin i)	60 km/s
Age	500 Myr

Other designations
- 15 Ori, BD+15°752, GC 6306, HD 33276, HIP 24010, HR 1676, SAO 94359, CCDM J05097+1536AB, WDS J05097+1536AB

Database references
SIMBAD	data

15 Orionis is a suspected astrometric binary star system in the equatorial constellation of Orion, near the border with Taurus. It is visible to the naked eye as a faint, yellow-white hued star with an apparent visual magnitude of 4.82. The system is approximately 340 light years away from the Sun based on parallax. It is moving further from the Earth with a heliocentric radial velocity of +29 km/s, having come to within 69 light-years some three million years ago.

The primary component is an early F-type subgiant star with a stellar classification of F2 IV, a star that has exhausted the hydrogen at its core and has begun to evolve into a giant. It has 3.42 times the mass of the Sun and 5.9 times the Sun's radius. The star still has a relatively high rotation rate, showing a projected rotational velocity of 60 km/s. It is radiating 300 times the luminosity of the Sun from its expanding photosphere at an effective temperature of 7,161 K.

It has one suspected companion, component B, at a separation of 0.3".
