= Omicron Draconis =

Variable star in the constellation Draco

- Location of ο Dra (circled)

Observation data Epoch J2000 Equinox ICRS
- Constellation: Draco
- Right ascension: 18^{h} 51^{m} 12.09530^{s}
- Declination: +59° 23′ 18.0627″
- Apparent magnitude (V): 4.65

Characteristics
- Spectral type: G9III
- U−B color index: +1.19
- Variable type: RS CVn + eclipsing

Astrometry
Radial velocity (R_{v})	−19.52 km/s
Proper motion (μ)	RA: 77.47 mas/yr Dec.: 25.37 mas/yr
Parallax (π)	9.54±0.21 mas
Distance	106.8 pc
Absolute magnitude (M_{V})	−0.344

Orbit
Period (P)	138.444±0.003 days
Semi-major axis (a)	0.00651±0.00003″
Eccentricity (e)	0.158±0.003
Inclination (i)	89.6±0.3°
Longitude of the node (Ω)	22.9±0.2°
Periastron epoch (T)	2454983.0±0.2
Argument of periastron (ω) (secondary)	293.0±0.6°
Semi-amplitude (K_{1}) (primary)	23.42±0.05 km/s
Semi-amplitude (K_{2}) (secondary)	32.0±0.4 km/s

Details

ο Dra A
Mass	1.35 M_{☉}
Radius	25.1 R_{☉}
Luminosity	220 L_{☉}
Surface gravity (log g)	1.769 cgs
Temperature	4,400 K
Metallicity [Fe/H]	−0.5 dex
Rotation	79
Rotational velocity (v sin i)	20.0 km/s
Age	3.0 Gyr

ο Dra B
Mass	0.99 M_{☉}
Radius	1.0 R_{☉}
Luminosity	1.3 L_{☉}
Surface gravity (log g)	4.43 cgs
Temperature	6,000 K

Other designations
- Omicron Draconis, 47 Draconis, HR 7125, HD 175306, HIP 92512, BD+59°1925

Database references
SIMBAD	data

Omicron Draconis (Latinised as ο Draconis, abbreviated to ο Dra) is a giant star in the constellation Draco located 322.93 light years from the Earth. Its path in the night sky is circumpolar for latitudes greater than 31^{o} north, meaning the star never rises or sets when viewed in the night sky.

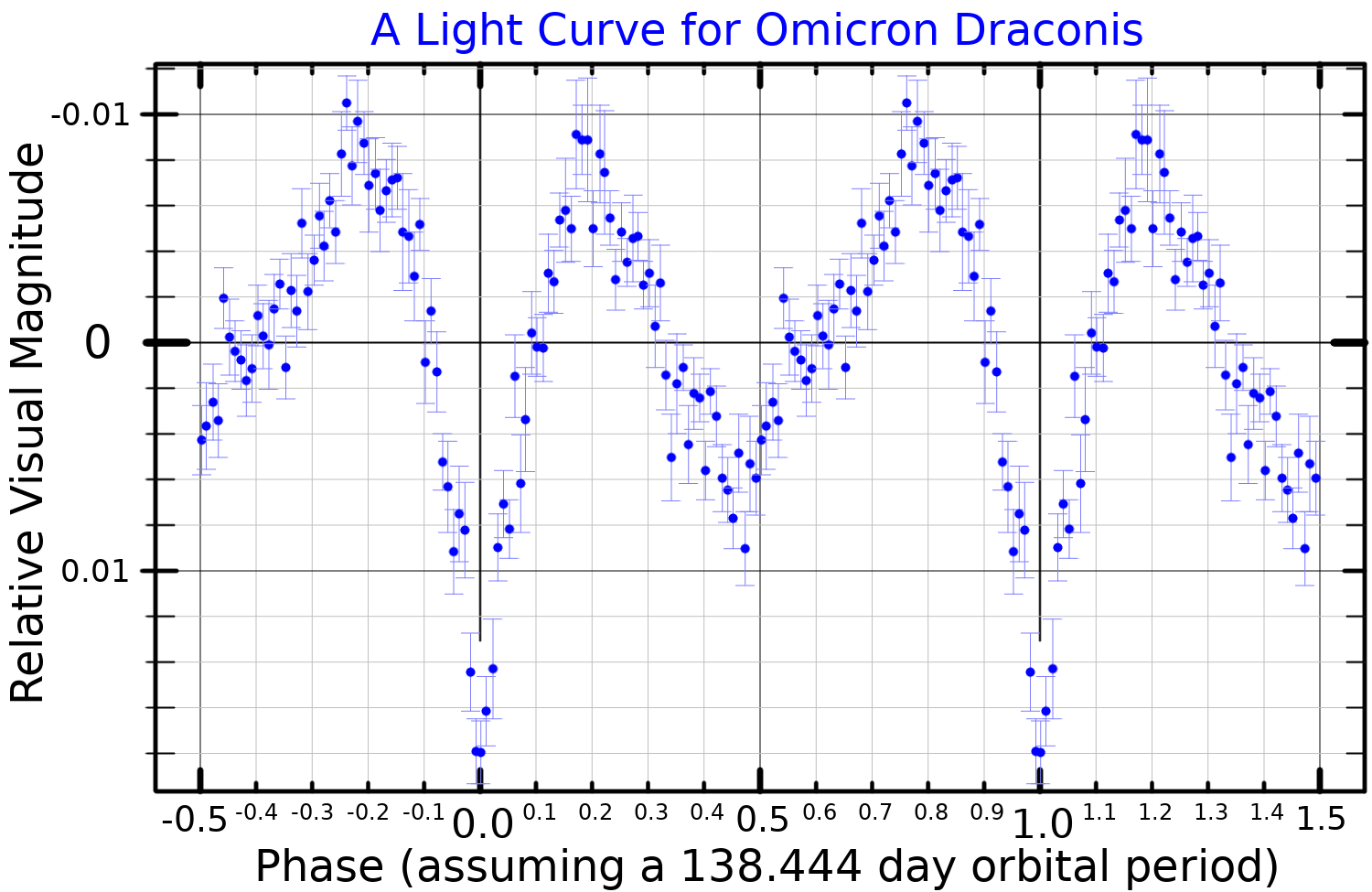
A visual band light curve for Omicron Draconis, adapted from Roettenbacher et al. (2015)

This is a single-lined spectroscopic binary system, but the secondary has been detected using interferometry. It is an RS Canum Venaticorum variable system with eclipses. The total amplitude of variation is only a few hundredths of a magnitude. The secondary star is similar to the Sun, presumably a main-sequence star, while the primary is a giant star 25 times larger than the Sun and two hundred times more luminous.

== Identities as pole star ==
Omicron Draconis can be considered the north pole star of Mercury, as it is the closest star to Mercury's north celestial pole. In addition to that, this star is currently the Moon's north pole star, which occurs once every 18.6 years.
