= Delta Doradus =

Star in the constellation Dorado

- Location of δ Doradus (circled in red)

Observation data Epoch J2000.0 Equinox J2000.0 (ICRS)
- Constellation: Dorado
- Right ascension: 05^{h} 44^{m} 46.370^{s}
- Declination: −65° 44′ 07.793″
- Apparent magnitude (V): +4.34

Characteristics
- Evolutionary stage: main sequence
- Spectral type: A7 V
- U−B color index: +0.11
- B−V color index: +0.22

Astrometry
Radial velocity (R_{v})	−8.3±0.8 km/s
Proper motion (μ)	RA: −29.111 mas/yr Dec.: +4.966 mas/yr
Parallax (π)	21.8720±0.1017 mas
Distance	149.1 ± 0.7 ly (45.7 ± 0.2 pc)
Absolute magnitude (M_{V})	+1.03

Details
Mass	1.85 M_{☉}
Radius	3.1 R_{☉}
Luminosity	27 L_{☉}
Surface gravity (log g)	3.89 cgs
Temperature	7,828±266 K
Metallicity [Fe/H]	−0.40 dex
Rotational velocity (v sin i)	172 km/s
Age	940 Myr

Other designations
- δ Dor, CPD−65°496, FK5 1154, HD 39014, HIP 27100, HR 2015, SAO 249346

Database references
SIMBAD	data

Delta Doradus is a star in the southern constellation of Dorado. Its name is a Bayer designation that is Latinized from δ Doradus and abbreviated delta Dor or δ Dor. Based upon an annual parallax shift of 21.80 mas as seen from Earth, it is located around 149 light-years (46 pc) from the Sun. The star is visible to the naked eye with an apparent visual magnitude of +4.34.

== Observation ==
This is an A-type main sequence star with a stellar classification of A7 V. It is spinning rapidly with a projected rotational velocity of 172 km/s. This is giving the star an oblate shape with an equatorial bulge that is 12% larger than the polar radius. Although A-type stars are not expected to harbor a magnetic dynamo needed to power X-ray emission, an X-ray flux of 3.6×10^{27} erg/s has been detected at these coordinates. This may indicate that the star has an unseen but active companion. δ Doradus displays an infrared excess suggesting it may be a Vega-like star with an orbiting debris disk.

Periodically this star is the Moon's south pole star, which occurs once every 18.6 years. The pole star status changes periodically, because of the precession of the Moon's rotational axis. When δ Doradus is the pole star, it is better aligned than Earth's Polaris (α Ursae Minoris), but much fainter. It is also the south pole star of Jupiter.
