= Eta1 Doradus =

Star in the constellation Dorado

Eta^{1} Doradus
Observation data Epoch J2000 Equinox ICRS
- Constellation: Dorado
- Right ascension: 06^{h} 06^{m} 09.38177^{s}
- Declination: −66° 02′ 22.6352″
- Apparent magnitude (V): 5.72

Characteristics
- Evolutionary stage: main sequence
- Spectral type: A0V
- U−B color index: −0.024±0.004
- B−V color index: −0.03

Astrometry
Radial velocity (R_{v})	+17.6±4.3 km/s
Proper motion (μ)	RA: +13.575 mas/yr Dec.: +28.139 mas/yr
Parallax (π)	9.5464±0.0474 mas
Distance	342 ± 2 ly (104.8 ± 0.5 pc)
Absolute magnitude (M_{V})	+0.75

Details
Mass	2.46 M_{☉}
Radius	2.5 R_{☉}
Luminosity	49 L_{☉}
Surface gravity (log g)	4.09±0.08 cgs
Temperature	10,325±240 K
Rotational velocity (v sin i)	149 km/s
Age	94 Myr

Other designations
- η^{1} Dor, CPD−66°493, GC 7813, HD 42525, HIP 28909, HR 2194, SAO 249448, PPM 355182, TYC 8905-1950-1

Database references
SIMBAD	data

Eta^{1} Doradus is a star in the southern constellation of Dorado. Its name is a Bayer designation that is Latinized from η^{1} Doradus and abbreviated Eta^{1} Dor or η^{1} Dor. This star is visible to the naked eye as a dim, white-hued point of light with an apparent visual magnitude of 5.72. It is located approximately 342 light years distant from the Sun, based on parallax, and is drifting further away with a radial velocity of +18 km/s. It is circumpolar south of latitude 24°S.

This is an A-type main-sequence star with a stellar classification of A0V. It is 94 million years old with a high rotation rate, showing a projected rotational velocity of 149 km/s. The star has 2.46 times the mass of the Sun and is radiating 49 times the Sun's luminosity from its photosphere at an effective temperature of 10,325 K. It is the northern pole star of Venus.
