= Eta Carinae =

Stellar system in the constellation Carina

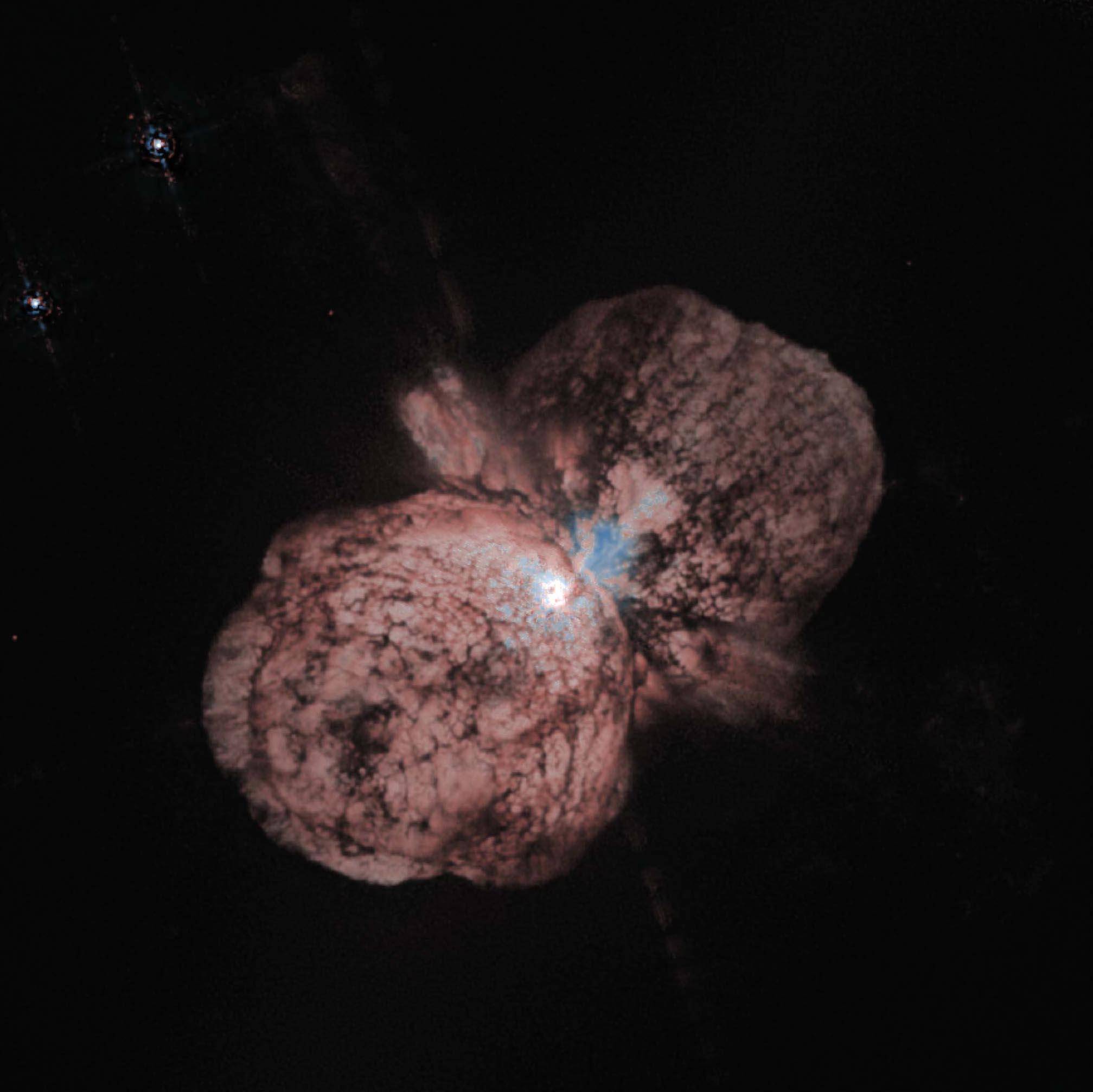
- The Homunculus Nebula, surrounding η Carinae, imaged by WFPC2 at red and near-ultraviolet wavelengths Credit: Jon Morse (University of Colorado) & Hubble Space Telescope (NASA)

Observation data Epoch J2000 Equinox ICRS
- Constellation: Carina
- Right ascension: 10^{h} 45^{m} 03.591^{s}
- Declination: −59° 41′ 04.26″
- Apparent magnitude (V): −1.0 to ~7.6; 4.2 (2018) ~3.9 (2026)

Characteristics
- Evolutionary stage: Luminous blue variable
- Spectral type: variable (LBV) + O5.5III-O7I (WR?)
- Apparent magnitude (U): 6.37
- Apparent magnitude (B): 6.82
- Apparent magnitude (R): 4.90
- Apparent magnitude (J): 3.39
- Apparent magnitude (H): 2.51
- Apparent magnitude (K): 0.94
- U−B colour index: −0.45
- B−V colour index: +0.61
- Variable type: LBV & binary

Astrometry
Radial velocity (R_{v})	−125.0 km/s
Proper motion (μ)	RA: −17.6 mas/yr Dec.: 1.0 mas/yr
Distance	7,500 ly (2,300 pc)

Orbit
Primary	η Car A
Secondary	η Car B
Period (P)	2,022.7±1.3 days (5.54 yr)
Semi-major axis (a)	15.4 AU
Eccentricity (e)	0.9
Inclination (i)	130–145°
Periastron epoch (T)	2009.03

Details

η Car A
Mass	~100 M_{☉}
Radius	128 (Note: at optical depth 10) – 742 (Note: at optical depth 2/3, near the top of the wind) R_{☉}
Luminosity	4,000,000 L_{☉}
Temperature	9,470–22,800 K
Age	<3 Myr

η Car B
Mass	30–80 M_{☉}
Radius	14.3–23.6 R_{☉}
Luminosity	<1 million L_{☉}
Temperature	37,200 K
Age	<3 Myr

Other designations
- Foramen, Tseen She, 231 G Carinae, HR 4210, HD 93308, CD−59°2620, IRAS 10431−5925, GC 14799, AAVSO 1041−59

Database references
SIMBAD	data

Eta Carinae (η Carinae, abbreviated to η Car), formerly known as η Argus, is a stellar system containing at least two stars with a combined luminosity greater than five million times that of the Sun, located around 7,500 light-years (2,300 parsecs) away in the constellation Carina. Previously a 4th-magnitude star, it brightened in 1837 to become brighter than Rigel, marking the start of its so-called "Great Eruption". It became the second-brightest star in the night sky between 11–14 March 1843 before fading well below naked-eye visibility after 1856. In a smaller eruption, it reached 6th magnitude in 1892 before fading again. It has brightened consistently since about 1940, becoming brighter than magnitude 4.5 by 2014.

At declination −59° 41′ 04.26″, η Carinae is circumpolar from locations on Earth south of latitude 30°S (for reference, the latitude of Johannesburg is 26°12′S), and is not visible north of about latitude 30°N, just south of Cairo (which is at a latitude of 30°02′N).

The two main stars of the η Carinae system have an eccentric orbit with a period of 5.54 years. The primary is an extremely unusual star, similar to a luminous blue variable (LBV). It was initially 150–250 M_{☉}, of which it has already lost at least 30 M_{☉}, and it is expected to explode as a supernova in the astronomically near future. This is the only star known to produce ultraviolet laser emission. The secondary star is hot and also highly luminous, probably of spectral class O, around 30–80 times as massive as the Sun. The system is heavily obscured by the Homunculus Nebula, which consists of material ejected from the primary during the Great Eruption. It is a member of the Trumpler 16 open cluster, itself embedded in the much larger Carina Nebula.

Although unrelated to the star and nebula, the weak Eta Carinids meteor shower has a radiant very close to η Carinae.

== Observational history ==
η Carinae was first recorded as a fourth-magnitude star in the 16th or 17th century. It became the second-brightest star in the sky in the mid-19th century, before fading below naked-eye visibility. During the second half of the 20th century, it slowly brightened to again become visible to the naked eye, and by 2014 was again a fourth-magnitude star.

=== Discovery and naming ===
There is no reliable evidence of η Carinae being observed or recorded before the 17th century, although Dutch navigator Pieter Keyser described a fourth-magnitude star at approximately the correct position around 1595–1596, which was copied onto the celestial globes of Petrus Plancius and Jodocus Hondius and the 1603 Uranometria of Johann Bayer. Frederick de Houtman's independent star catalogue from 1603 does not include η Carinae among the other 4th magnitude stars in the region. The earliest firm record was made by Edmond Halley in 1677 when he recorded the star simply as Sequens (i.e. "following" relative to another star) within a new constellation Robur Carolinum. His Catalogus Stellarum Australium was published in 1679. The star was also known by the Bayer designations η Roboris Caroli, η Argus, or η Navis. In 1751 Nicolas-Louis de Lacaille gave the stars of Argo Navis and Robur Carolinum a single set of Greek letter Bayer designations within his constellation Argo, and designated three areas within Argo for the purposes of using Latin letter designations three times over. The letter η fell within the keel portion of the ship which was later to become the constellation Carina. It was not generally known as η Carinae until 1879, when the stars of Argo Navis were finally given the epithets of the daughter constellations in the Uranometria Argentina of Gould.

η Carinae is too far south to be part of the mansion-based traditional Chinese astronomy, but it was mapped when the Southern Asterisms were created at the start of the 17th century. Together with s Carinae, λ Centauri and λ Muscae, η Carinae forms the asterism 海山 (Sea and Mountain). Its modern Chinese name is 海山二 (Hǎi Shān èr, English: the Second Star of Sea and Mountain). R. H. Allen's 1899 book Star Names claimed the Chinese name Tseen She (Chinese: 天社; pinyin: tiānshè, "Heaven's altar") for η Carinae, but this is actually the name of an asterism. The Latin name Foramen ("opening", "hole") is occasionally seen; it may have originated in a 1923 astrology book.

Halley gave an approximate apparent magnitude 4 at the time of discovery, which has been calculated as magnitude 3.3 on the modern scale. The handful of possible earlier sightings suggest that η Carinae was not significantly brighter than this for much of the 17th century. Further sporadic observations over the next 70 years show that η Carinae was probably around 3rd magnitude or fainter, until Lacaille reliably recorded it at 2nd magnitude in 1751. It is unclear whether η Carinae varied significantly in brightness over the next 50 years; there are occasional observations such as William Burchell's at 4th magnitude in 1815, but it is uncertain whether these are just re-recordings of earlier observations.

=== Great Eruption ===
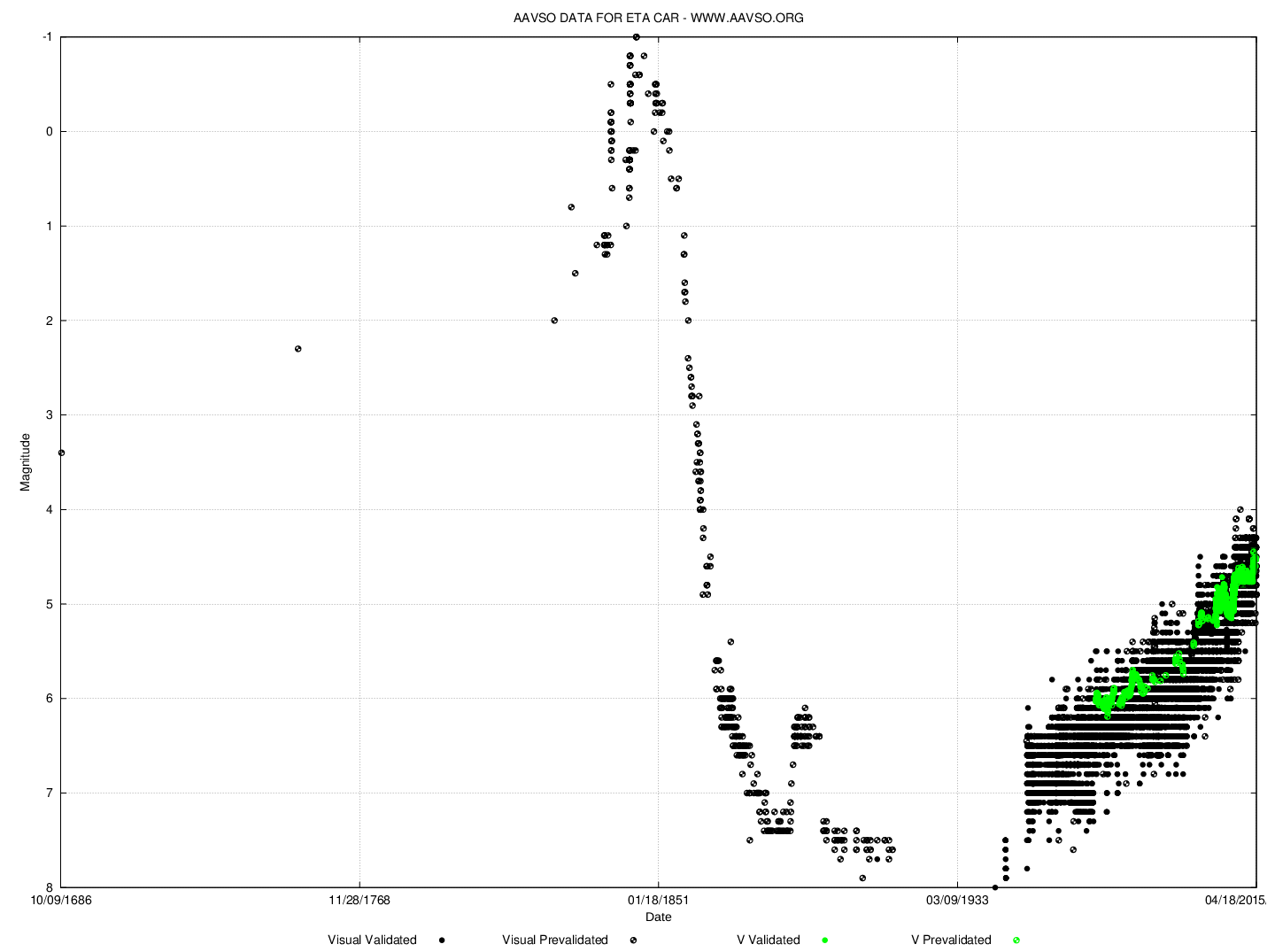
The lightcurve of η Carinae from some of the earliest observations until 2015

In 1827, Burchell specifically noted η Carinae's unusual brightness at 1st magnitude, and was the first to suspect that it varied in brightness. John Herschel, who was in South Africa at the time, made a detailed series of accurate measurements in the 1830s showing that η Carinae consistently shone around magnitude 1.4 until November 1837. On the evening of 16 December 1837, Herschel was astonished to see that it had brightened to slightly outshine Rigel. This event marked the beginning of a roughly 18-year period known as the Great Eruption.

η Carinae was brighter still on 27 January 1838, equivalent to Alpha Centauri, before fading slightly over the following three months. Herschel did not observe the star after this, but received correspondence from the Reverend W. S. Mackay in Calcutta, who wrote in 1843, "To my great surprise I observed this March last (1843), that the star η Argus had become a star of the first magnitude fully as bright as Canopus, and in colour and size very like Arcturus." Observations at the Cape of Good Hope indicated it peaked in brightness, surpassing Canopus, from 11 to 14 March 1843, then began to fade, then brightened to between the brightness of Alpha Centauri and Canopus between 24 and 28 March before fading once again. For much of 1844 the brightness was midway between Alpha Centauri and Beta Centauri, around magnitude +0.2, before brightening again at the end of the year. At its brightest in 1843 it likely reached an apparent magnitude of −0.8, then −1.0 in 1845. The peaks in 1827, 1838 and 1843 are likely to have occurred at the periastron passage—the point the two stars are closest together—of the binary orbit. From 1845 to 1856, the brightness decreased by around 0.1 magnitudes per year, but with possible rapid and large fluctuations.

In their oral traditions, the Boorong clan of the Wergaia people of Lake Tyrrell, north-western Victoria, Australia, told of a reddish star they knew as Collowgullouric War /ˈkɒləɡʌlərɪk ˈwɑːr/ "Old Woman Crow", the wife of War "Crow" (Canopus). In 2010, astronomers Duane Hamacher and David Frew from Macquarie University in Sydney showed that this was η Carinae during its Great Eruption in the 1840s. From 1857, the brightness decreased rapidly until it faded below naked-eye visibility by 1886. This has been calculated to be due to the condensation of dust in the ejected material surrounding the star, rather than to an intrinsic change in luminosity.

=== Lesser Eruption ===
A new brightening started in 1887, peaked at about magnitude 6.2 in 1892, then at the end of March 1895 faded rapidly to about magnitude 7.5. Although there are only visual records of the 1890 eruption, it has been calculated that η Carinae was suffering 4.3 magnitudes of visual extinction due to the gas and dust ejected in the Great Eruption. An unobscured brightness would have been magnitude 1.5–1.9, significantly brighter than the historical magnitude. Despite this, it was similar to the first one, even almost matching its brightness, but not the amount of material expelled.

=== Twentieth century ===
Between 1900 and at least 1940, η Carinae appeared to have settled at a constant brightness of around magnitude 7.6, but in 1953 it was noted to have brightened again to magnitude 6.5. The brightening continued steadily, but with fairly regular variations of a few tenths of a magnitude.

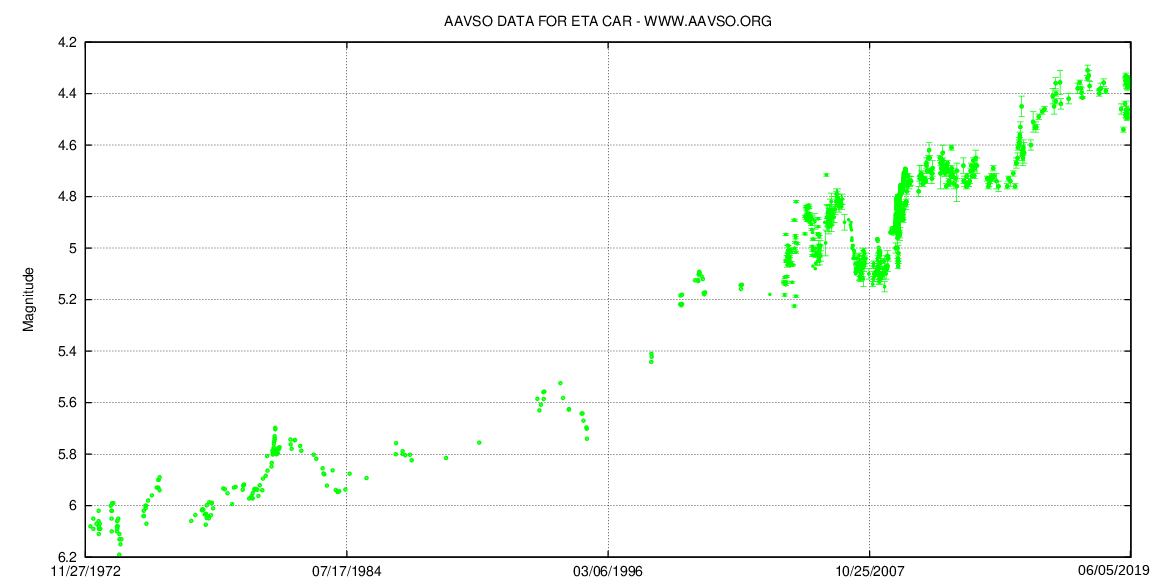
Light curve for η Carinae between 1972 and 2019

In 1996, the variations were first identified as having a 5.52 year period, later measured more accurately at 5.54 years, leading to the idea of a binary system. The binary theory was confirmed by observations of radio, optical and near-infrared radial velocity and line profile changes, referred to collectively as a spectroscopic event, at the predicted time of periastron passage in late 1997 and early 1998. At the same time there was a complete collapse of the X-ray emission presumed to originate in a colliding wind zone. The confirmation of a luminous binary companion greatly modified the understanding of the physical properties of the η Carinae system and its variability.

A sudden doubling of brightness was observed in 1998–99 bringing it back to naked-eye visibility. During the 2014 spectroscopic event, the apparent visual magnitude became brighter than magnitude 4.5. The brightness does not always vary consistently at different wavelengths, and does not always exactly follow the 5.5 year cycle. Radio, infrared and space-based observations have expanded coverage of η Carinae across all wavelengths and revealed ongoing changes in the spectral energy distribution.

In July 2018, η Carinae was reported to have the strongest colliding wind shock in the solar neighbourhood. Observations with the NuSTAR satellite gave much higher resolution data than the earlier Fermi Gamma-ray Space Telescope. Using direct focussing observations of the non-thermal source in the extremely hard X-ray band that is spatially coincident with the star, they showed that the source of non-thermal X-rays varies with the orbital phase of the binary star system and that the photon index of the emission is similar to that derived through analysis of the γ-ray (gamma) spectrum.

== Visibility ==
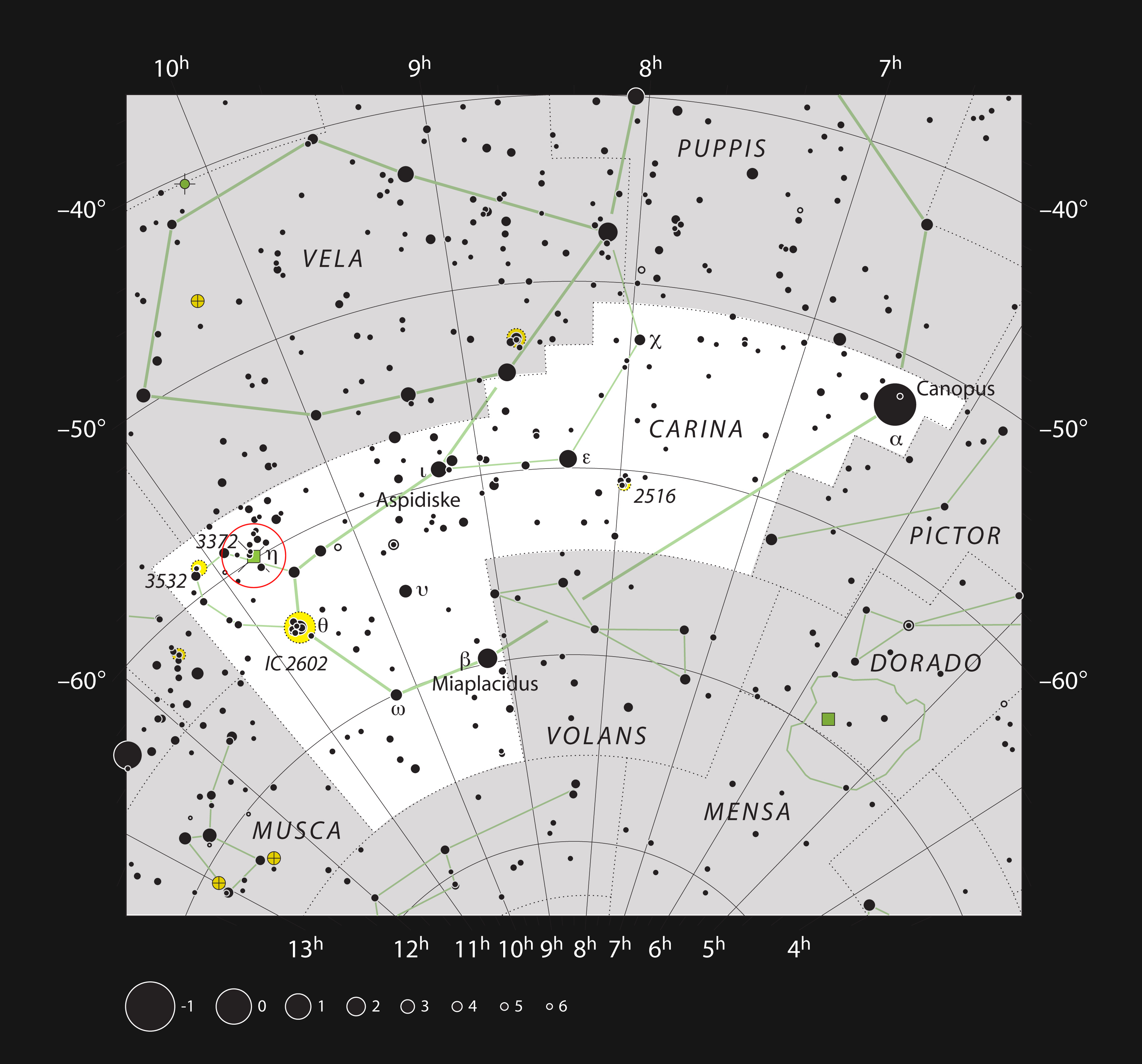
η Carinae and Carina Nebula in the constellation of Carina

Position of η Carinae (top left) compared to PP Carinae (bottom right)

As a fourth-magnitude star, η Carinae is comfortably visible to the naked eye in all but the most light-polluted skies in inner-city areas according to the Bortle scale. Its brightness has varied over a wide range, from the second-brightest star in the sky for a few days in the 19th century, to well below naked-eye visibility. Its location at around 60°S in the far southern celestial hemisphere means it cannot be seen by observers in Europe and much of North America.

Located between Canopus and the Southern Cross, η Carinae is easily pinpointed as the brightest star within the large naked-eye Carina Nebula. In a telescope the "star" is framed within the dark "V" dust lane of the nebula and appears distinctly orange and clearly non-stellar. High magnification will show the two orange lobes of a surrounding reflection nebula known as the Homunculus Nebula on either side of a bright central core. Variable star observers can compare its brightness with several 4th- and 5th-magnitude stars closely surrounding the nebula.

Discovered in 1961, the weak Eta Carinids meteor shower has a radiant very close to η Carinae. Occurring from 14 to 28 January, the shower peaks around 21 January. Meteor showers are not associated with bodies outside the Solar System, making the proximity to η Carinae merely a coincidence.

=== Visual spectrum ===
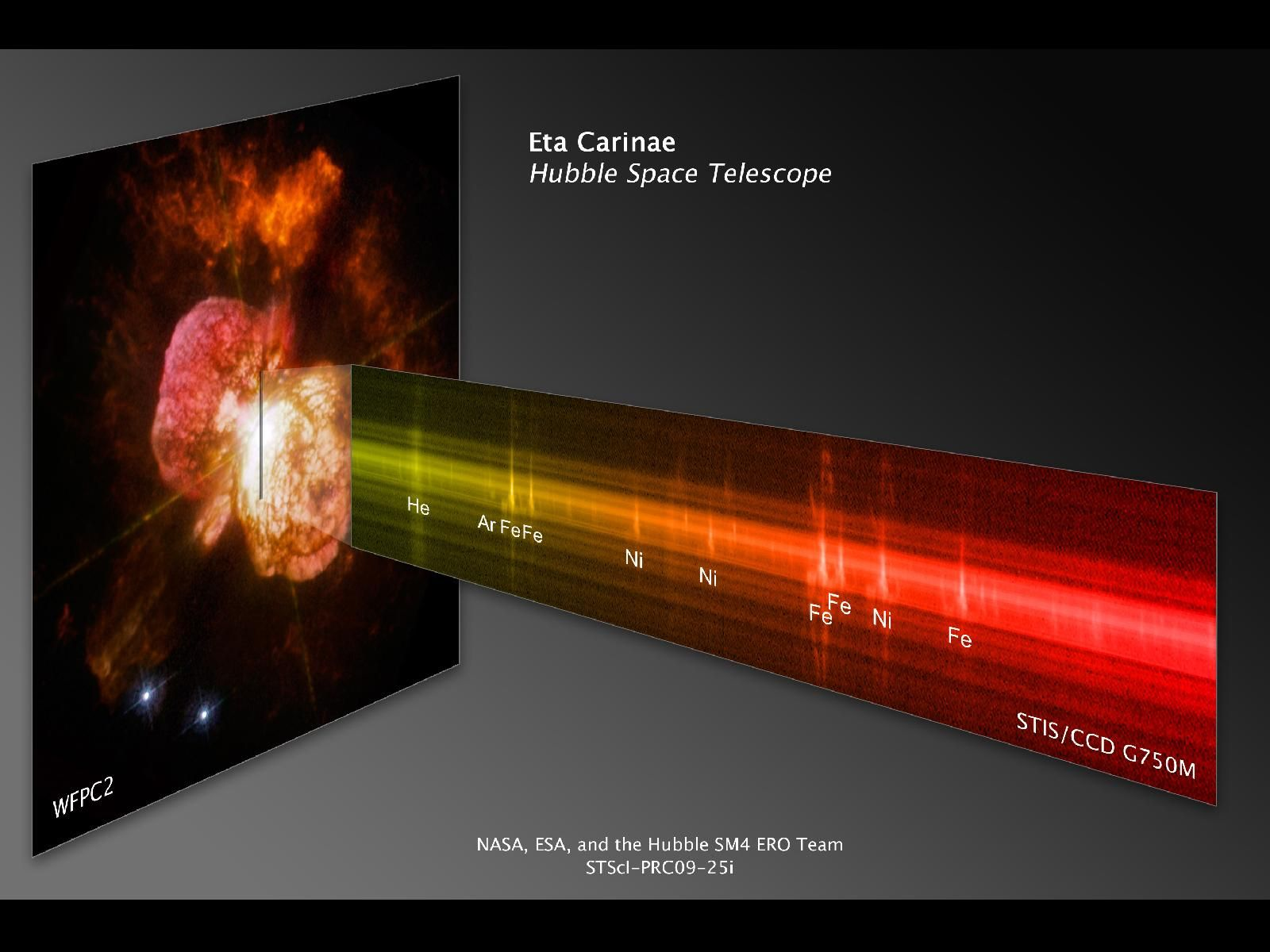
Hubble Space Telescope composite of η Carinae showing the unusual emission spectrum (near-IR image spectrum from the Hubble Space Telescope Imaging Spectrograph CCD)

The strength and profile of the lines in the η Carinae spectrum are highly variable, but there are a number of consistent distinctive features. The spectrum is dominated by emission lines, usually broad although the higher excitation lines are overlaid by a narrow central component from dense ionised nebulosity, especially the Weigelt Blobs. Most lines show a P Cygni profile but with the absorption wing much weaker than the emission. The broad P Cygni lines are typical of strong stellar winds, with very weak absorption in this case because the central star is so heavily obscured. Electron scattering wings are present but relatively weak, indicating a clumpy wind. Hydrogen lines are present and strong, showing that η Carinae still retains much of its hydrogen envelope.

He^{I} (Note: The roman numerals are ion notation, where "I" indicates neutral elements, "II" singly ionized elements, etc. See Spectral line.) lines are much weaker than the hydrogen lines, and the absence of He^{II} lines provides an upper limit to the possible temperature of the primary star. N^{II} lines can be identified but are not strong, while carbon lines cannot be detected and oxygen lines are at best very weak, indicating core hydrogen burning via the CNO cycle with some mixing to the surface. Perhaps the most striking feature is the rich Fe^{II} emission in both permitted and forbidden lines, with the forbidden lines arising from excitation of low density nebulosity around the star.

The earliest analyses of the star's spectrum are descriptions of visual observations from 1869, of prominent emission lines "C, D, b, F and the principal green nitrogen line". Absorption lines are explicitly described as not being visible. The letters refer to Fraunhofer's spectral notation and correspond to H_{α}, He^{I}, (Note: Fraunhofer "D" usually refers to the sodium doublet; "d" or "D_{3}" was used for the nearby helium line.) Fe^{II}, and H_{β}.

It is assumed that the final line is from Fe^{II} very close to the green nebulium line now known to be from O^{III}.

Photographic spectra from 1893 were described as similar to an F5 star, but with a few weak emission lines. Analysis to modern spectral standards suggests an early F spectral type. By 1895 the spectrum again consisted mostly of strong emission lines, with the absorption lines present but largely obscured by emission. This spectral transition from F supergiant to strong emission is characteristic of novae, where ejected material initially radiates like a pseudo-photosphere and then the emission spectrum develops as it expands and thins.

The emission line spectrum associated with dense stellar winds has persisted ever since the late 19th century. Individual lines show widely varying widths, profiles and Doppler shifts, often multiple velocity components within the same line. The spectral lines also show variation over time, most strongly with a 5.5-year period but also less dramatic changes over shorter and longer periods, as well as ongoing secular development of the entire spectrum. The spectrum of light reflected from the Weigelt Blobs, and assumed to originate mainly with the primary, is similar to the extreme P Cygni-type star HDE 316285 which has a spectral type of B0Ieq.

Animation showing the expanding light echo caused by the η Carinae eruption in the Carina Nebula

Direct spectral observations did not begin until after the Great Eruption, but light echoes from the eruption reflected from other parts of the Carina Nebula were detected using the U.S. National Optical Astronomy Observatory's Blanco 4-meter telescope at the Cerro Tololo Inter-American Observatory. Analysis of the reflected spectra indicated the light was emitted when η Carinae had the appearance of a 5,000 K G2-to-G5 supergiant, some 2,000 K cooler than expected from other supernova impostor events. Further light echo observations show that following the peak brightness of the Great Eruption the spectrum developed prominent P Cygni profiles and CN molecular bands, although this is likely from the material being ejected which may have been colliding with circumstellar material in a similar way to a Type IIn supernova.

In the second half of the 20th century, much higher-resolution visual spectra became available. The spectrum continued to show complex and baffling features, with much of the energy from the central star being recycled into the infrared by surrounding dust, some reflection of light from the star from dense localised objects in the circumstellar material, but with obvious high-ionisation features indicative of very high temperatures. The line profiles are complex and variable, indicating a number of absorption and emission features at various velocities relative to the central star.

The 5.5-year orbital cycle produces strong spectral changes at periastron that are known as spectroscopic events. Certain wavelengths of radiation suffer eclipses, either due to actual occultation by one of the stars or due to passage within opaque portions of the complex stellar winds. Despite being ascribed to orbital rotation, these events vary significantly from cycle to cycle. These changes have become stronger since 2003 and it is generally believed that long-term secular changes in the stellar winds or previously ejected material may be the culmination of a return to the state of the star before its Great Eruption.

=== Ultraviolet ===
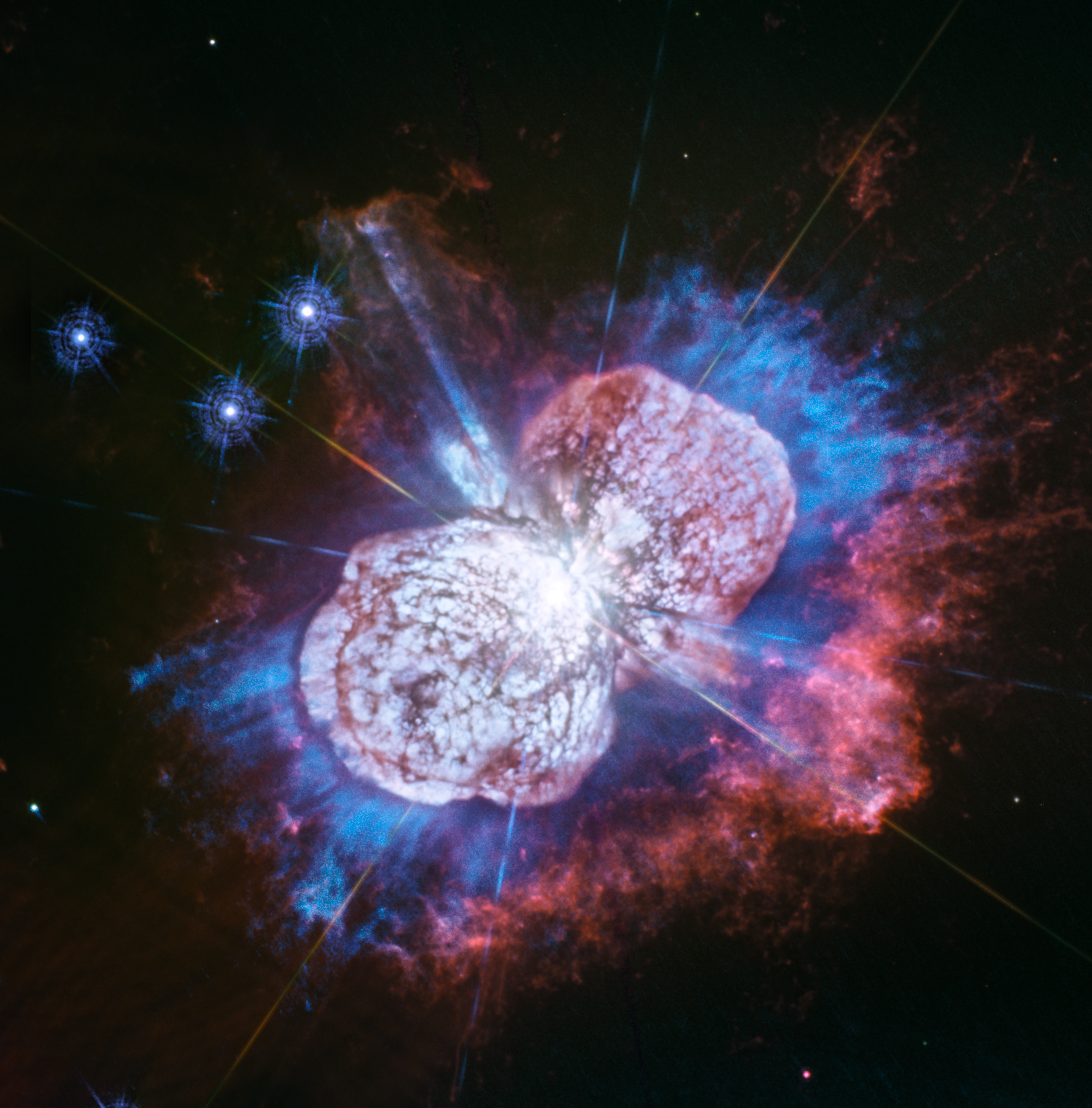
Ultraviolet image of Homunculus Nebula taken by ESA / Hubble

The ultraviolet spectrum of the η Carinae system shows many emission lines of ionised metals such as Fe^{II} and Cr^{II}, as well as Lyman_{α} (Ly_{α}) and a continuum from a hot central source. The ionisation levels and continuum require the existence of a source with a temperature at least 37,000 K.

Certain Fe^{II} UV lines are unusually strong. These originate in the Weigelt Blobs and are caused by a low-gain lasing effect. Ionised hydrogen between a blob and the central star generates intense Ly_{α} emission which penetrates the blob. The blob contains atomic hydrogen with a small admixture of other elements, including iron photo-ionised by radiation from the central stars. An accidental resonance (where emission coincidentally has a suitable energy to pump the excited state) allows the Ly_{α} emission to pump the Fe^{+} ions to certain pseudo-metastable states, creating a population inversion that allows the stimulated emission to take place. This effect is similar to the maser emission from dense pockets surrounding many cool supergiant stars, but the latter effect is much weaker at optical and UV wavelengths and η Carinae is the only clear instance detected of an ultraviolet astrophysical laser. A similar effect from pumping of metastable O^{I} states by Ly_{β} emission has also been confirmed as an astrophysical UV laser.

=== Infrared ===
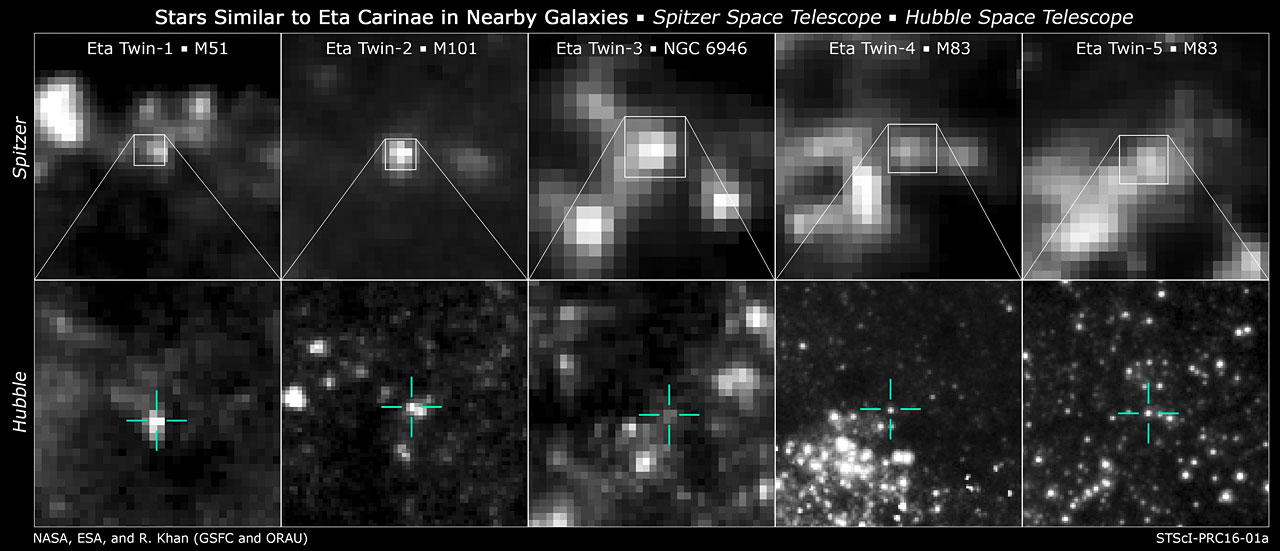
Stars similar to η Carinae in nearby galaxies

Infrared observations of η Carinae have become increasingly important. The vast majority of the electromagnetic radiation from the central stars is absorbed by surrounding dust, then emitted as mid- and far infrared appropriate to the temperature of the dust. This allows almost the entire energy output of the system to be observed at wavelengths that are not strongly affected by interstellar extinction, leading to estimates of the luminosity that are more accurate than for other extremely luminous stars. η Carinae is the brightest source in the night sky at mid-infrared wavelengths.

Far infrared observations show a large mass of dust at 100–150 K, suggesting a total mass for the Homunculus of 20 solar masses (M_{☉}) or more. This is much larger than previous estimates, and is all thought to have been ejected in a few years during the Great Eruption.

Near-infrared observations can penetrate the dust at high resolution to observe features that are completely obscured at visual wavelengths, although not the central stars themselves. The central region of the Homunculus contains a smaller Little Homunculus from the 1890 eruption, a butterfly of separate clumps and filaments from the two eruptions, and an elongated stellar wind region.

=== High energy radiation ===
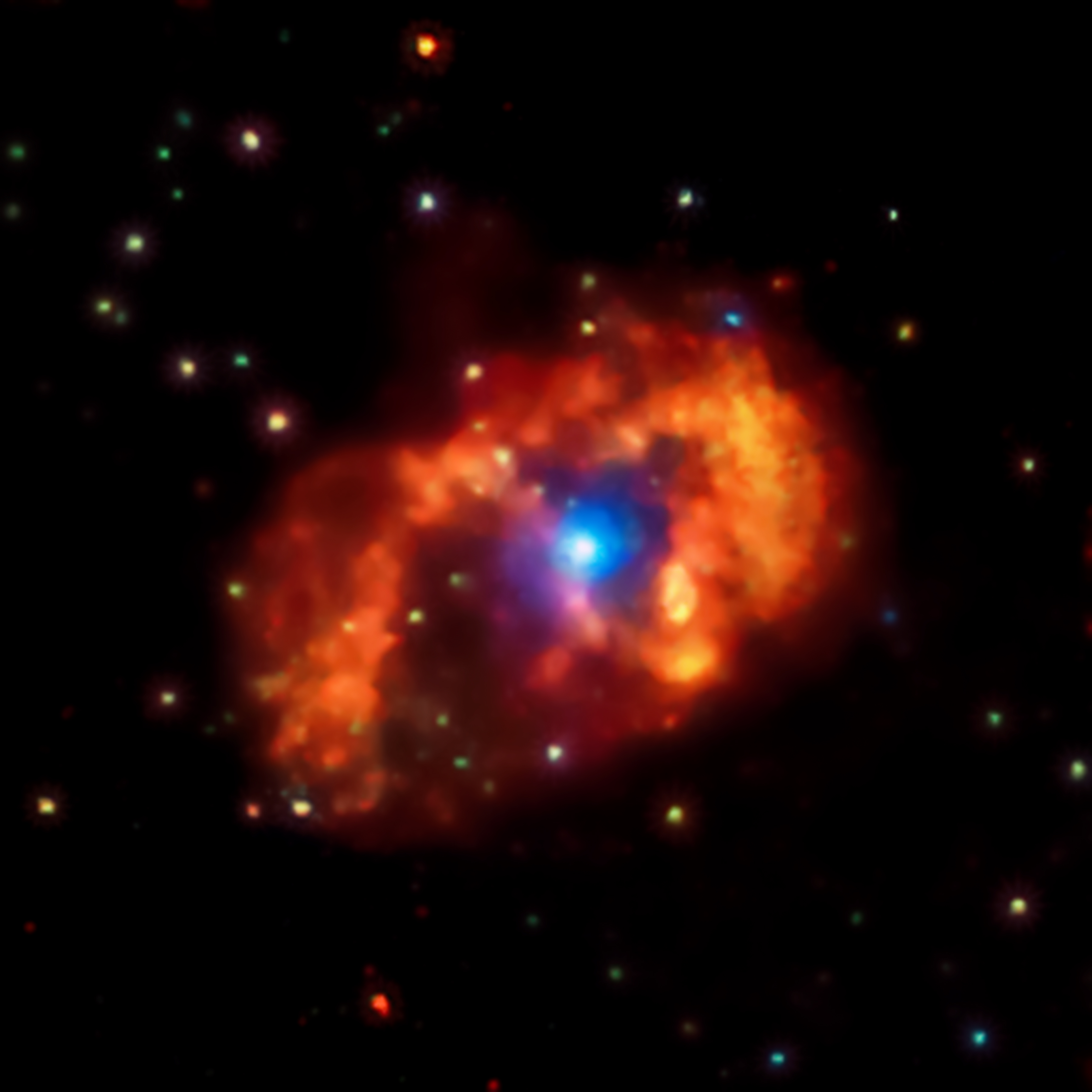
X-rays around η Carinae (red is low energy, blue higher)

Several X-ray and gamma ray sources have been detected around η Carinae, for example 4U 1037–60 in the 4th Uhuru catalogue and 1044–59 in the HEAO-2 catalog. The earliest detection of X-rays in the η Carinae region was from the Terrier-Sandhawk rocket, followed by Ariel 5, OSO 8, and Uhuru sightings.

More detailed observations were made with the Einstein Observatory, ROSAT X-ray telescope, Advanced Satellite for Cosmology and Astrophysics (ASCA), and Chandra X-ray Observatory. There are multiple sources at various wavelengths right across the high energy electromagnetic spectrum: hard X-rays and gamma rays within 1 light-month of the η Carinae; hard X-rays from a central region about 3 light-months wide; a distinct partial ring "horse-shoe" structure in low-energy X-rays 0.67 parsec (2.2 light-years) across corresponding to the main shockfront from the Great Eruption; diffuse X-ray emission across the whole area of the Homunculus; and numerous condensations and arcs outside the main ring.

All the high-energy emission associated with η Carinae varies during the orbital cycle. A spectroscopic minimum, or X-ray eclipse, occurred in July and August 2003, and similar events in 2009 and 2014 have been intensively observed. The highest-energy gamma rays above 100 MeV detected by AGILE show strong variability, while lower-energy gamma rays observed by Fermi show little variability.

=== Radio emission ===
Radio emissions have been observed from η Carinae across the microwave band. It has been detected in the 21 cm H^{I} line, but has been particularly closely studied in the millimetre and centimetre bands. Masing hydrogen recombination lines (from the combining of an electron and proton to form a hydrogen atom) have been detected in this range. The emission is concentrated in a small non-point source less than 4 arcseconds across and appears to be mainly free-free emission (thermal bremsstrahlung) from ionised gas, consistent with a compact H^{II} region at around 10,000 K. High resolution imaging shows the radio frequencies originating from a disk a few arcseconds in diameter, 10,000 astronomical units (AU) wide at the distance of η Carinae.

The radio emission from η Carinae shows continuous variation in strength and distribution over a 5.5 year cycle. The H^{II} and recombination lines vary very strongly, with continuum emission (electromagnetic radiation across a broad band of wavelengths) less affected. This shows a dramatic reduction in the ionisation level of the hydrogen for a short period in each cycle, coinciding with the spectroscopic events at other wavelengths.

== Surroundings ==
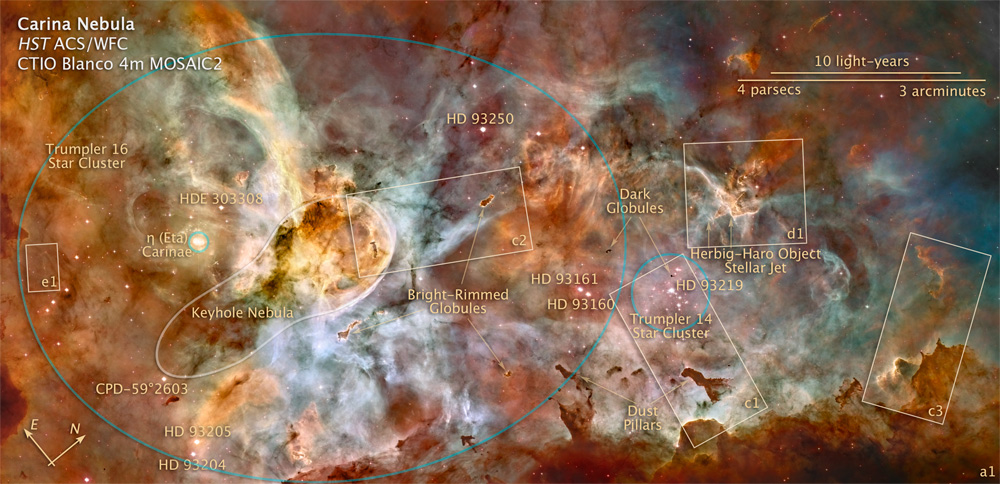
Annotated image of Carina Nebula

η Carinae is found within the Carina Nebula, a giant star-forming region in the Carina–Sagittarius Arm of the Milky Way. The nebula is a prominent naked-eye object in the southern skies showing a complex mix of emission, reflection and dark nebulosity. η Carinae is known to be at the same distance as the Carina Nebula and its spectrum can be seen reflected off various star clouds in the nebula. The appearance of the Carina Nebula, and particularly of the Keyhole region, has changed significantly since it was described by John Herschel over 160 years ago. This is thought to be due to the reduction in ionising radiation from Eta Carinae since the Great Eruption. Prior to the Great Eruption the η Carinae system contributed up to 20% of the total ionising flux for the whole Carina Nebula, but that is now mostly blocked by the surrounding gas and dust.

=== Trumpler 16 ===
η Carinae lies within the scattered stars of the Trumpler 16 open cluster. All the other members are well below naked eye visibility, although WR 25 is another extremely massive luminous star. Trumpler 16 and its neighbour Trumpler 14 are the two dominant star clusters of the Carina OB1 association, an extended grouping of young luminous stars with a common motion through space.

=== Homunculus ===
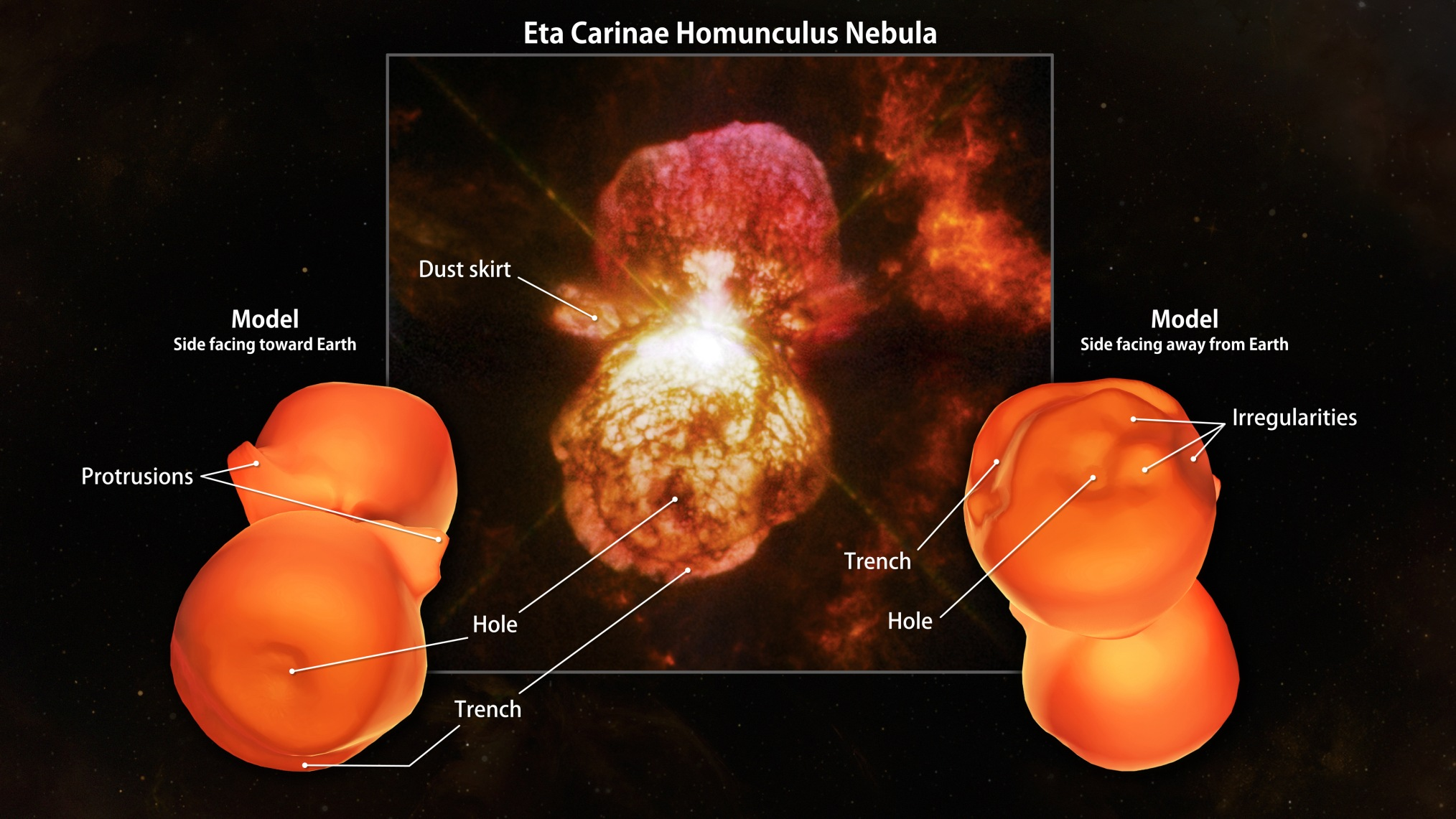
A 3D model of the Homunculus Nebula

η Carinae is enclosed by, and lights up, the Homunculus Nebula, a small emission and reflection nebula composed mainly of gas ejected during the Great Eruption event in the mid-19th century, as well as dust that condensed from the debris. The nebula consists of two polar lobes aligned with the rotation axis of the star, plus an equatorial "skirt", the whole being around 18″ long. Closer studies show many fine details: a Little Homunculus within the main nebula, probably formed by the 1890 eruption; a jet; fine streams and knots of material, especially noticeable in the skirt region; and three Weigelt Blobs—dense gas condensations very close to the star itself.

The lobes of the Homunculus are considered to be formed almost entirely due to the initial eruption, rather than shaped by or including previously ejected or interstellar material, although the scarcity of material near the equatorial plane allows some later stellar wind and ejected material to mix. Therefore, the mass of the lobes gives an accurate measure of the scale of the Great Eruption, with estimates ranging from 12–15 M_{☉} up to as high as 45 M_{☉}. The results show that the material from the Great Eruption is strongly concentrated towards the poles; 75% of the mass and 90% of the kinetic energy were released above latitude 45°.

A unique feature of the Homunculus is the ability to measure the spectrum of the central object at different latitudes by the reflected spectrum from different portions of the lobes. These clearly show a polar wind where the stellar wind is faster and stronger at high latitudes thought to be due to rapid rotation causing gravity brightening towards the poles. In contrast the spectrum shows a higher excitation temperature closer to the equatorial plane. By implication the outer envelope of η Carinae A is not strongly convective as that would prevent the gravity darkening. The current axis of rotation of the star does not appear to exactly match the alignment of the Homunculus. This may be due to interaction with η Carinae B which also modifies the observed stellar winds.

== Distance ==
The distance to η Carinae has been determined by several different methods, resulting in a widely accepted value of 2,330 parsecs (7,600 light-years), with a margin of error around 100 parsecs (330 light-years). The distance to η Carinae itself cannot be measured using parallax due to its surrounding nebulosity, but other stars in the Trumpler 16 cluster are expected to be at a similar distance and are accessible to parallax. Gaia Data Release 2 has provided the parallax for many stars considered to be members of Trumpler 16, finding that the four hottest O-class stars in the region have very similar parallaxes with a mean value of 0.383±0.017 milliarcseconds (mas), which translates to a distance of 2,600±100 parsecs. This implies that η Carinae may be more distant than previously thought, and also more luminous, although it is still possible that it is not at the same distance as the cluster or that the parallax measurements have large systematic errors. Parallax measurements of neighbouring stars in Trumpler 16 by the Gaia Data Release 3 give a distance consistent with 2,330 parsecs.

The distances to star clusters can be estimated by using a Hertzsprung–Russell diagram or colour–colour diagram to calibrate the absolute magnitudes of the stars, for example fitting the main sequence or identifying features such as a horizontal branch, and hence their distance from Earth. It is also necessary to know the amount of interstellar extinction to the cluster and this can be difficult in regions such as the Carina Nebula. A distance of 7,330 light-years (2,250 parsecs) has been determined from the calibration of O-type star luminosities in Trumpler 16. After determining an abnormal reddening correction to the extinction, the distance to both Trumpler 14 and Trumpler 16 has been measured at 9,500±1,000 light-years (2,900±300 parsecs).

The known expansion rate of the Homunculus Nebula provides an unusual geometric method for measuring its distance. Assuming that the two lobes of the nebula are symmetrical, the projection of the nebula onto the sky depends on its distance. Values of 2,250 and 2,300 parsecs have been derived for the Homunculus, and η Carinae is clearly at the same distance.

== Properties ==
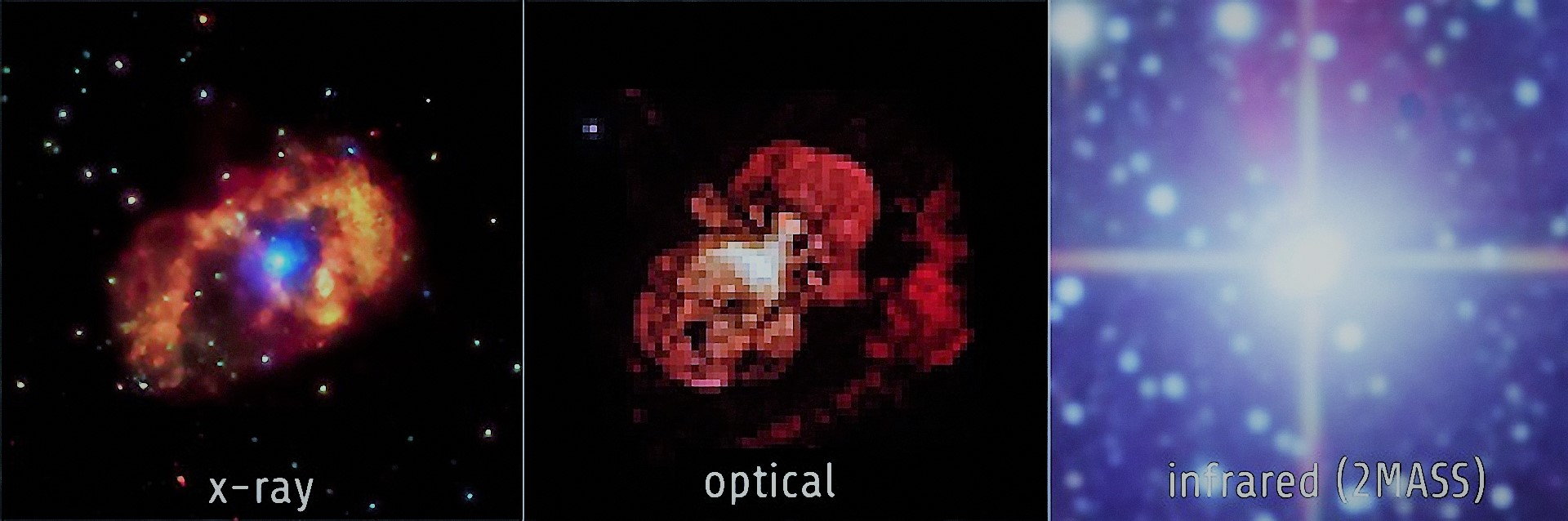
X-ray, optical and infrared images of η Carinae (26 August 2014)

The η Carinae star system is currently one of the most massive stars that can be studied in great detail. Until recently η Carinae was thought to be the most massive single star, but the system's binary nature was proposed by the Brazilian astronomer Augusto Damineli in 1996 and confirmed in 2005. Both component stars are largely obscured by circumstellar material ejected from η Carinae A, and basic properties such as their temperatures and luminosities can only be inferred. Rapid changes to the stellar wind in the 21st century suggest that the star itself may be revealed when dust from the great eruption finally clears.

=== Orbit ===
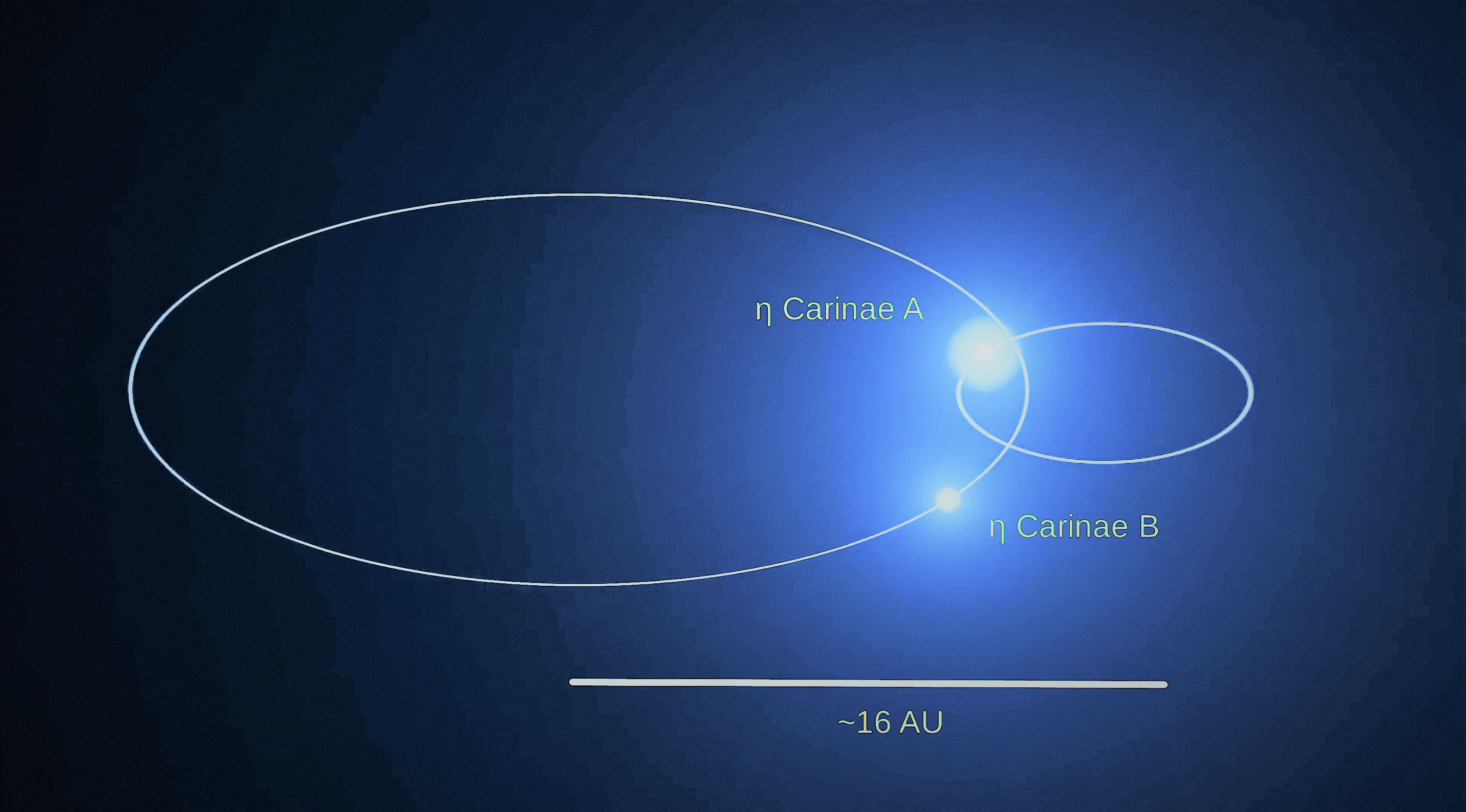
Eta Carinae orbit

The binary nature of η Carinae is clearly established, although the components have not been directly observed and cannot even be clearly resolved spectroscopically due to scattering and re-excitation in the surrounding nebulosity. Periodic photometric and spectroscopic variations prompted the search for a companion, and modelling of the colliding winds and partial "eclipses" of some spectroscopic features have constrained the possible orbits.

The period of the orbit is accurately known at 5.539 years, although this has changed over time due to mass loss and accretion. Between the Great Eruption and the smaller 1890 eruption, the orbital period was apparently 5.52 years, while before the Great Eruption it may have been lower still, possibly between 4.8 and 5.4 years. The orbital separation is only known approximately, with a semi-major axis of 15–16 AU. The orbit is highly eccentric, e = 0.9 . This means that the separation of the stars varies from around 1.6 AU, similar to the distance of Mars from the Sun, to 30 AU, similar to the distance of Neptune.

Perhaps the most valuable use of an accurate orbit for a binary star system is to directly calculate the masses of the stars. This requires the dimensions and inclination of the orbit to be accurately known. The dimensions of η Carinae's orbit are only known approximately as the stars cannot be directly and separately observed. The inclination has been modelled at 130–145 degrees, but the orbit is still not known accurately enough to provide the masses of the two components.

=== Classification ===
η Carinae A is classified as a luminous blue variable (LBV) due to the distinctive spectral and brightness variations. This type of variable star is characterised by irregular changes from a high temperature quiescent state to a low temperature outburst state at roughly constant luminosity. LBVs in the quiescent state lie on a narrow S Doradus instability strip, with more luminous stars being hotter. In outburst all LBVs have about the same temperature, which is near 8,000 K. LBVs in a normal outburst are visually brighter than when quiescent although the bolometric luminosity is unchanged.

An event similar to η Carinae A's Great Eruption has been observed in only one other star in the Milky Way — P Cygni — and in a handful of other possible LBVs in other galaxies. None of them seem to be quite as violent as η Carinae's. It is unclear if this is something that only a very few of the most massive LBVs undergo, something that is caused by a close companion star, or a very brief but common phase for massive stars. Some similar events in external galaxies have been mistaken for supernovae and have been called supernova impostors, although this grouping may also include other types of non-terminal transients that approach the brightness of a supernova.

η Carinae A is not a typical LBV. It is more luminous than any other LBV in the Milky Way although possibly comparable to other supernova impostors detected in external galaxies. It does not currently lie on the S Doradus instability strip, although it is unclear what the temperature or spectral type of the underlying star actually is, and during its Great Eruption it was much cooler than a typical LBV outburst, with a middle-G spectral type. The 1890 eruption may have been fairly typical of LBV eruptions, with an early F spectral type, and it has been estimated that the star may currently have an opaque stellar wind, forming a pseudo-photosphere with a temperature of 9,000–10,000 K.

η Carinae B is a massive luminous hot star, about which little else is known. From certain high excitation spectral lines that ought not to be produced by the primary, η Carinae B is thought to be a young O-type star. Most authors suggest it is a somewhat evolved star such as a supergiant or giant, although a Wolf–Rayet star cannot be ruled out.

=== Mass ===
The masses of stars are difficult to measure except by determination of a binary orbit. η Carinae is a binary system, but certain key information about the orbit is not known accurately. The mass can be strongly constrained to be greater than 90 M_{☉}, due to the high luminosity. Standard models of the system assume masses of 100–120 M_{☉} and 30–60 M_{☉} for the primary and secondary, respectively. Higher masses have been suggested, to model the energy output and mass transfer of the Great Eruption, with a combined system mass of over 250 M_{☉} before the Great Eruption. η Carinae A has clearly lost a great deal of mass since it formed, and it is thought that it was initially 150–250 M_{☉}, although it may have formed through binary merger. Masses of 200 M_{☉} for the primary and 90 M_{☉} for the secondary best-fit one-mass-transfer model of the Great Eruption event.

=== Mass loss ===
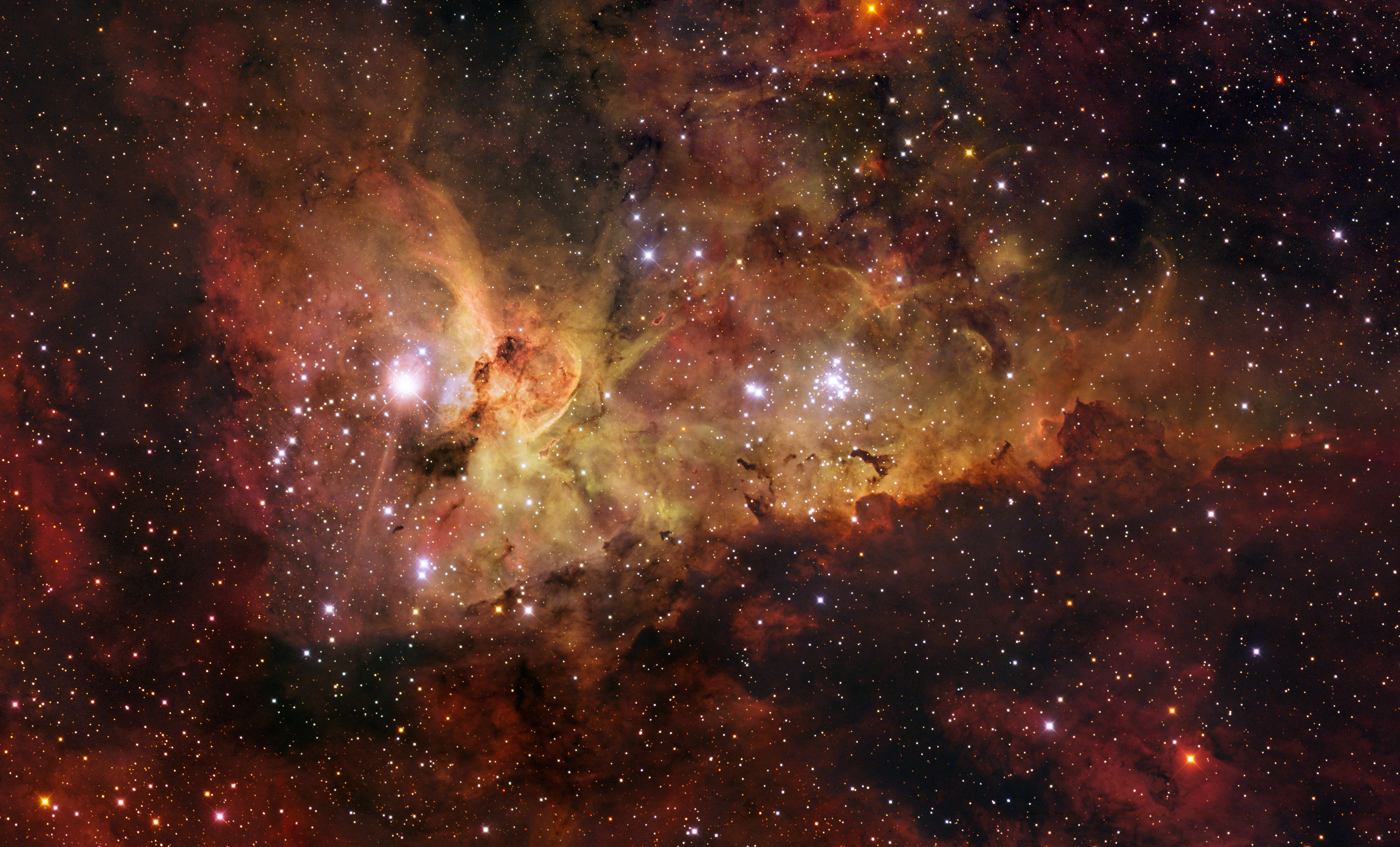
The Carina Nebula. η Carinae is the brightest star, on the left side.

Mass loss is one of the most intensively studied aspects of massive star research. Put simply, calculated mass loss rates in the best models of stellar evolution do not reproduce the observed properties of evolved massive stars such as Wolf–Rayets, the number and types of core collapse supernovae, or their progenitors. To match those observations, the models require much higher mass loss rates. η Carinae A has one of the highest known mass loss rates, currently around 10^{−3} M_{☉}/year, and is an obvious candidate for study.

η Carinae A is losing a lot of mass due to its extreme luminosity and relatively low surface gravity. Its stellar wind is entirely opaque and appears as a pseudo-photosphere; this optically dense surface hides any true physical surface of the star that may be present. (At extreme rates of radiative mass loss, the density gradient of lofted material may become continuous enough that a meaningfully discrete physical surface may not exist.) During the Great Eruption the mass loss rate was a thousand times higher, around 1 M_{☉}/year sustained for ten years or more. The total mass loss during the eruption was at least 10–20 M_{☉} with much of it now forming the Homunculus Nebula. The smaller 1890 eruption produced the Little Homunculus Nebula, much smaller and only about 0.1 M_{☉}. The bulk of the mass loss occurs in a wind with a terminal velocity of about 420 km/s, but some material is seen at higher velocities, up to 3,200 km/s, possibly material blown from the accretion disk by the secondary star.

η Carinae B is presumably also losing mass via a thin, fast stellar wind, but this cannot be detected directly. Models of the radiation observed from interactions between the winds of the two stars show a mass loss rate of the order of 10^{−5} M_{☉}/year at speeds of 3,000 km/s, typical of a hot O-class star. For a portion of the highly eccentric orbit, it may actually gain material from the primary via an accretion disk. During the Great Eruption of the primary, the secondary could have accreted several M_{☉}, producing strong jets which formed the bipolar shape of the Homunculus Nebula.

=== Luminosity ===
The stars of the η Carinae system are completely obscured by dust and opaque stellar winds, with much of the ultraviolet and visual radiation shifted to infrared. The total electromagnetic radiation across all wavelengths for both stars combined is several million solar luminosities (L_{☉}). The best estimate for the luminosity of the primary is 5 million L_{☉} making it one of the most luminous stars in the Milky Way. The luminosity of η Carinae B is particularly uncertain, probably several hundred thousand L_{☉} and almost certainly no more than 1 million L_{☉}.

The most notable feature of η Carinae is its giant eruption or supernova impostor event, which originated in the primary star and was observed around 1843. In a few years, it produced almost as much visible light as a faint supernova explosion, but the star survived. It is estimated that at peak brightness the luminosity was as high as 50 million L_{☉}. Other supernova impostors have been seen in other galaxies, for example the possible false supernova SN 1961V in NGC 1058 and SN 2006jc's pre-explosion outburst in UGC 4904.

Following the Great Eruption, η Carinae became self-obscured by the ejected material, resulting in dramatic reddening. This has been estimated at four magnitudes at visual wavelengths, meaning the post-eruption luminosity was comparable to the luminosity when first identified. η Carinae is still much brighter at infrared wavelengths, despite the presumed hot stars behind the nebulosity. The recent visual brightening is considered to be largely caused by a decrease in the extinction, due to thinning dust or a reduction in mass loss, rather than an underlying change in the luminosity.

=== Temperature ===
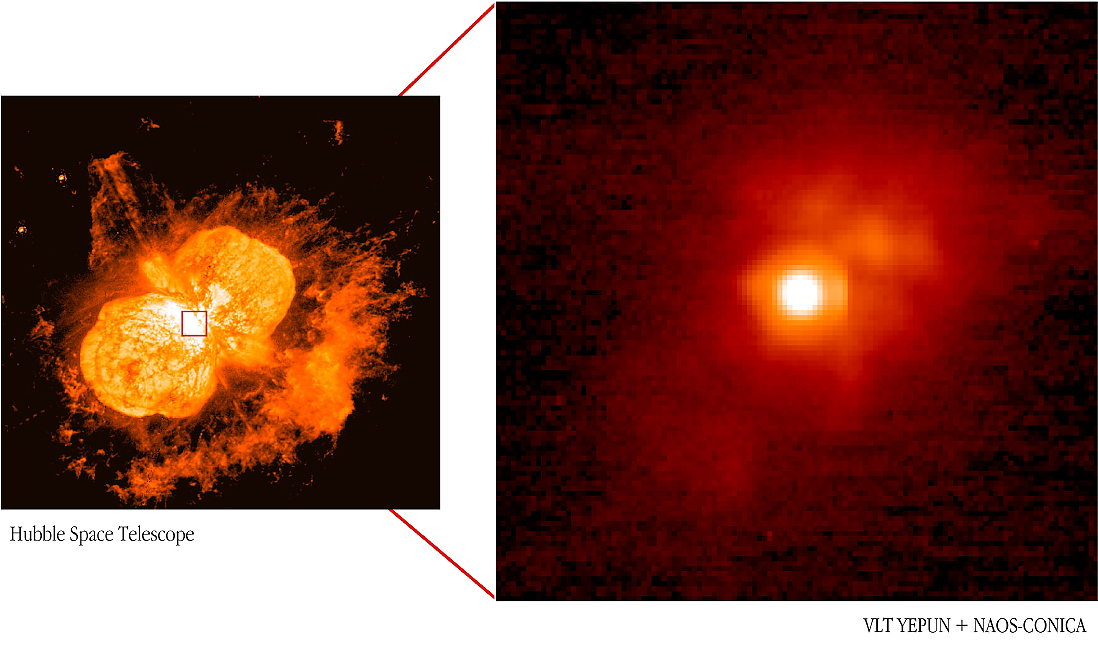
Hubble image of the Homunculus Nebula; inset is a VLT NACO infrared image of η Carinae.

Until late in the 20th century, the temperature of η Carinae was assumed to be over 30,000 K because of the presence of high-excitation spectral lines, but other aspects of the spectrum suggested much lower temperatures and complex models were created to account for this. It is now known that the Eta Carinae system consists of at least two stars, both with strong stellar winds and a shocked colliding wind (wind-wind collision or WWC) zone, embedded within a dusty nebula that reprocesses 90% of the electromagnetic radiation into the mid and far infrared. All of these features have different temperatures.

The powerful stellar winds from the two stars collide in a roughly conical WWC zone and produce temperatures as high as 100 MK at the apex between the two stars. This zone is the source of the hard X-rays and gamma rays close to the stars. Near periastron, as the secondary ploughs through ever denser regions of the primary wind, the colliding wind zone becomes distorted into a spiral trailing behind η Carinae B.

The wind-wind collision cone separates the winds of the two stars. For 55–75° behind the secondary, there is a thin hot wind typical of O or Wolf–Rayet stars. This allows some radiation from η Carinae B to be detected and its temperature can be estimated with some accuracy due to spectral lines that are unlikely to be produced by any other source. Although the secondary star has never been directly observed, there is widespread agreement on models where it has a temperature between 37,000 K and 41,000 K.

In all other directions on the other side of the wind-wind collision zone, there is the wind from η Carinae A, cooler and around 100 times denser than η Carinae B's wind. It is also optically dense, completely obscuring anything resembling a true photosphere and rendering any definition of its temperature moot. The observable radiation originates from a pseudo-photosphere where the optical density of the wind drops to near zero, typically measured at a particular Rosseland opacity value such as 2/3. This pseudo-photosphere is observed to be elongated and hotter along the presumed axis of rotation.

η Carinae A is likely to have appeared as an early B hypergiant with a temperature of between 20,000 K and 25,000 K at the time of its discovery by Halley. An effective temperature determined for the surface of a spherical optically thick wind at several hundred R_{☉} would be 9,400–15,000 K, while the temperature of a theoretical 60 R_{☉} hydrostatic "core" at optical depth 150 would be 35,200 K. The effective temperature of the visible outer edge of the opaque primary wind is generally treated as being 15,000–25,000 K on the basis of visual and ultraviolet spectral features assumed to be directly from the wind or reflected via the Weigelt Blobs. During the great eruption, η Carinae A was much cooler at around 5,000 K.

The Homunculus contains dust at temperatures varying from 150 K to 400 K. This is the source of almost all the infrared radiation that makes η Carinae such a bright object at those wavelengths.

Further out, expanding gases from the Great Eruption collide with interstellar material and are heated to around 5 MK, producing less energetic X-rays seen in a horseshoe or ring shape.

=== Size ===
The size of the two main stars in the η Carinae system is difficult to determine precisely, for neither star can be seen directly. η Carinae B is likely to have a well-defined photosphere, and its radius can be estimated from the assumed type of star. An O supergiant of 933,000 L_{☉} with a temperature of 37,200 K has an effective radius of 23.6 R_{☉}.

The size of η Carinae A is not even well defined. It has an optically dense stellar wind, so the typical definition of a star's surface being approximately where it becomes opaque gives a very different result to where a more traditional definition of a surface might be. One study calculated a radius of 60 R_{☉} for a hot "core" of 35,000 K at optical depth 150, near the sonic point or very approximately what might be called a physical surface. At optical depth 0.67 the radius would be over 800 R_{☉}, indicating an extended optically thick stellar wind. At the peak of the Great Eruption the radius, so far as such a thing is meaningful during such a violent expulsion of material, would have been around 4,319 - 6,032 R_{☉}, far larger than the largest known red supergiants, including VY Canis Majoris.

The stellar sizes should be compared with their orbital separation, which is only around 250 R_{☉} at periastron. The accretion radius of the secondary is around 60 R_{☉}, suggesting strong accretion near periastron leading to a collapse of the secondary wind. It has been proposed that the initial brightening from 4th magnitude to 1st at relatively constant bolometric luminosity was a normal LBV outburst, albeit from an extreme example of the class. Then the companion star passing through the expanded photosphere of the primary at periastron triggered the further brightening, increase in luminosity, and extreme mass loss of the Great Eruption.

=== Rotation ===
Rotation rates of massive stars have a critical influence on their evolution and eventual death. The rotation rate of the η Carinae stars cannot be measured directly because their surfaces cannot be seen. Single massive stars spin down quickly due to braking from their strong winds, but there are hints that both η Carinae A and B are fast rotators, up to 90% of critical velocity. One or both could have been spun up by binary interaction, for example accretion onto the secondary and orbital dragging on the primary.

== Eruptions ==
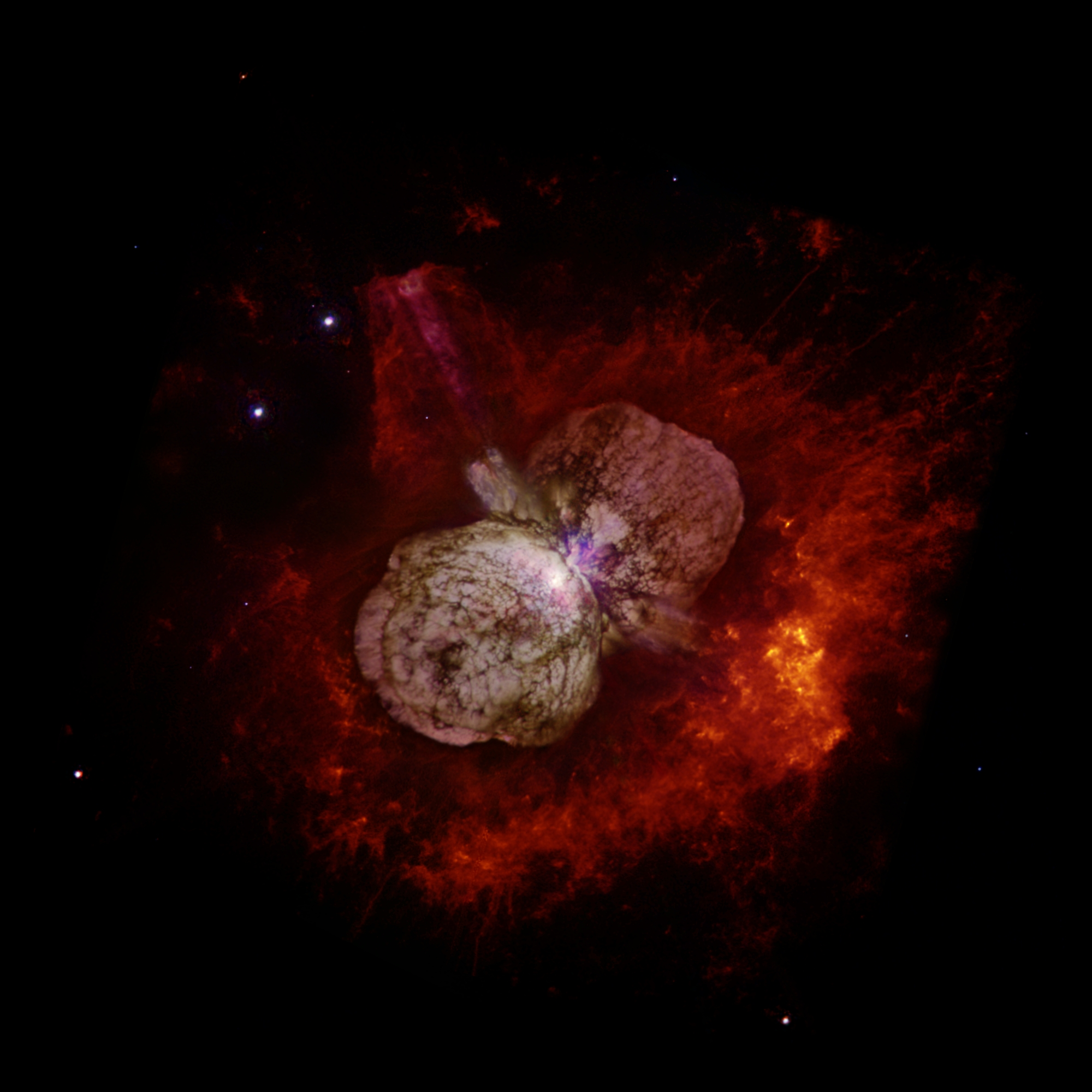
Hubble Space Telescope image showing the bipolar Homunculus Nebula which surrounds Eta Carinae

Two eruptions have been observed from η Carinae, the Great Eruption of the mid-19th century and the Lesser Eruption of 1890. In addition, studies of outlying nebulosity suggest at least one earlier eruption around 1250 ce. A further eruption may have occurred around 1550 ce, although it is possible that the material indicating this eruption is actually from the Great Eruption slowed down by colliding with older nebulosity. The mechanism producing these eruptions is unknown. It is not even clear whether the eruptions involve explosive events or so-called super-Eddington winds, an extreme form of stellar wind involving very high mass loss induced by an increase in the luminosity of the star. The energy source for the explosions or luminosity increase is also unknown.

Theories about the various eruptions must account for: repeating events, at least three eruptions of various sizes; ejecting 20 M_{☉} or more without destroying the star; the highly unusual shape and expansion rates of the ejected material; and the light curve during the eruptions involving a brightness increases of several magnitudes over a period of decades. The best-studied event is the Great Eruption. As well as photometry during the 19th century, light echoes observed in the 21st century give further information about the progression of the eruption, showing a brightening with multiple peaks for approximately 20 years, followed by a plateau period in the 1850s. The light echoes show that the outflow of material during the plateau phase was much higher than before the peak of the eruption. Possible explanations for the eruptions include: a binary merger in what was then a triple system; mass transfer to η Carinae B during periastron passages; or a pulsational pair-instability explosion.

== Evolution ==
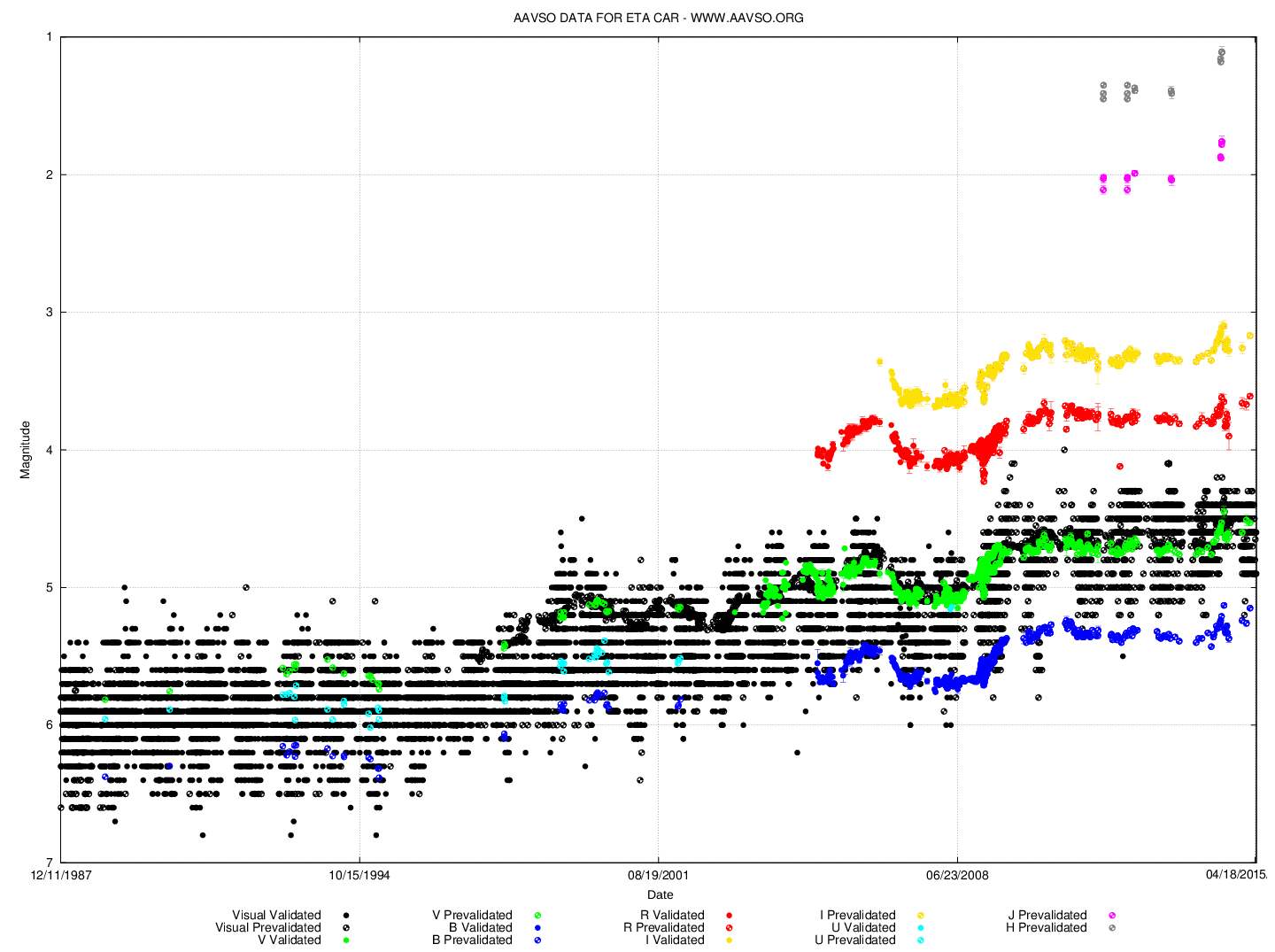
The recent light curve of η Carinae, with observations at standard wavelengths marked

η Carinae is a unique object, with no very close analogues currently known in any galaxy. Therefore, its future evolution is highly uncertain, but almost certainly involves further mass loss and an eventual supernova.

η Carinae A would have begun life as an extremely hot star on the main sequence, already a highly luminous object over a million L_{☉}. The exact properties would depend on the initial mass, which is expected to have been at least 150 M_{☉} and possibly much higher. A typical spectrum when first formed would be O2If and the star would be mostly or fully convective due to CNO cycle fusion at the very high core temperatures. Sufficiently massive or differentially rotating stars undergo such strong mixing that they remain chemically homogeneous during core hydrogen burning.

As core hydrogen burning progresses, a very massive star would slowly expand and become more luminous, becoming a blue hypergiant and eventually an LBV while still fusing hydrogen in the core. When hydrogen at the core is depleted after 2–2.5 million years, hydrogen shell burning continues with further increases in size and luminosity, although hydrogen shell burning in chemically homogeneous stars may be very brief or absent since the entire star would become depleted of hydrogen. In the late stages of hydrogen burning, mass loss is extremely high due to the high luminosity and enhanced surface abundances of helium and nitrogen. As hydrogen burning ends and core helium burning begins, massive stars transition very rapidly to the Wolf–Rayet stage with little or no hydrogen, increased temperatures and decreased luminosity. They are likely to have lost over half their initial mass at this point.

It is unclear whether triple-alpha helium fusion has started at the core of η Carinae A. The elemental abundances at the surface cannot be accurately measured, but ejecta within the Homunculus are around 60% hydrogen and 40% helium, with nitrogen enhanced to ten times solar levels. This is indicative of ongoing CNO cycle hydrogen fusion.

Models of the evolution and death of single very massive stars predict an increase in temperature during helium core burning, with the outer layers of the star being lost. It becomes a Wolf–Rayet star on the nitrogen sequence, moving from WNL to WNE as more of the outer layers are lost, possibly reaching the WC or WO spectral class as carbon and oxygen from the triple alpha process reach the surface. This process would continue with heavier elements being fused until an iron core develops, at which point the core collapses and the star is destroyed. Subtle differences in initial conditions, in the models themselves, and most especially in the rates of mass loss, produce different predictions for the final state of the most massive stars. They may survive to become a helium-stripped star or they may collapse at an earlier stage while they retain more of their outer layers. The lack of sufficiently luminous WN stars and the discovery of apparent LBV supernova progenitors has also prompted the suggestion that certain types of LBVs explode as a supernova without evolving further.

η Carinae is a close binary and this complicates the evolution of both stars. Compact massive companions can strip mass from larger primary stars much more quickly than would occur in a single star, so the properties at core collapse can be very different. In some scenarios, the secondary can accrue significant mass, accelerating its evolution, and in turn be stripped by the now compact Wolf–Rayet primary. In the case of η Carinae, the secondary is clearly causing additional instability in the primary, making it difficult to predict future developments.

=== Potential supernova ===
Supernovae types depending on initial mass and metallicity

The overwhelming probability is that the next supernova observed in the Milky Way will originate from an unknown white dwarf or anonymous red supergiant, very likely not even visible to the naked eye. Nevertheless, the prospect of a supernova originating from an object as extreme, nearby, and well studied as η Carinae arouses great interest.

As a single star, a star originally around 150 times as massive as the Sun would typically reach core collapse as a Wolf–Rayet star within 3 million years. At low metallicity, many massive stars will collapse directly to a black hole with no visible explosion or a sub-luminous supernova, and a small fraction will produce a pair-instability supernova, but at solar metallicity and above, there is expected to be sufficient mass loss before collapse to allow a visible supernova of Type Ib or Ic. If there is still a large amount of expelled material close to the star, the shock formed by the supernova explosion impacting the circumstellar material can efficiently convert kinetic energy to radiation, resulting in a superluminous supernova (SLSN) or hypernova, several times more luminous than a typical core collapse supernova and much longer-lasting. Highly massive progenitors may also eject sufficient nickel to cause a SLSN simply from the radioactive decay. The resulting remnant would be a black hole, for it is highly unlikely such a massive star could ever lose sufficient mass for its core not to exceed the limit for a neutron star.

The existence of a massive companion brings many other possibilities. If η Carinae A was rapidly stripped of its outer layers, it might be a less massive WC- or WO-type star when core collapse was reached. This would result in a Type Ib or Type Ic supernova due to the lack of hydrogen and possibly helium. This supernova type is thought to be the originator of certain classes of gamma-ray bursts, but models predict they occur only normally in less massive stars.

Several unusual supernovae and impostors have been compared to η Carinae as examples of its possible fate. One of the most compelling is SN 2009ip, a blue supergiant which underwent a supernova impostor event in 2009 with similarities to η Carinae's Great Eruption, then an even brighter outburst in 2012 which is likely to have been a true supernova. SN 2006jc, some 77 million light-years away in UGC 4904, in the constellation Lynx, also underwent a supernova impostor brightening in 2004, followed by a magnitude 13.8 Type Ib supernova, first seen on 9 October 2006. η Carinae has also been compared to other possible supernova impostors such as SN 1961V and iPTF14hls, and to superluminous supernovae such as SN 2006gy.

=== Possible effects on Earth ===
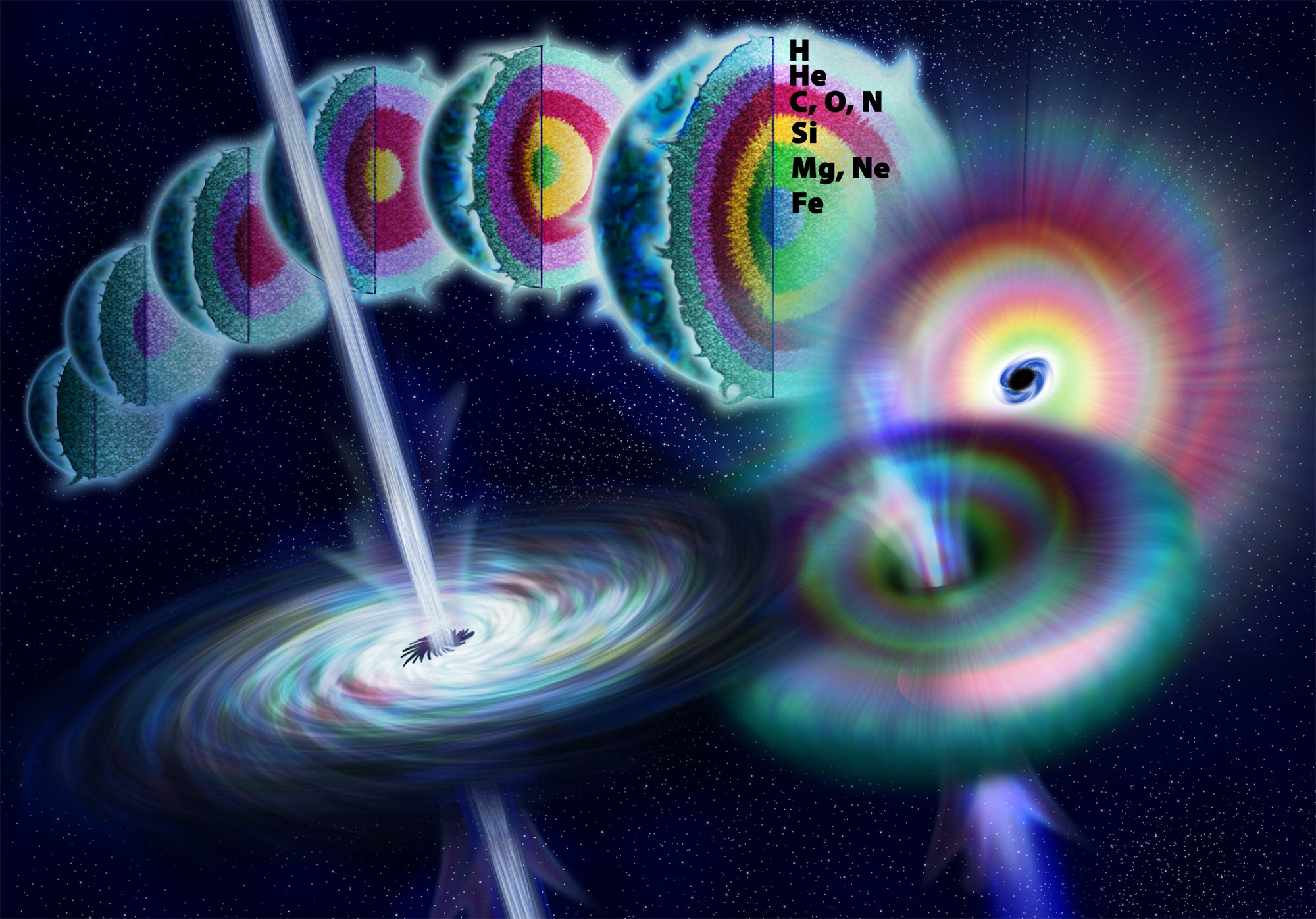
One theory of η Carinae's ultimate fate is collapsing to form a black hole—energy released as jets along the axis of rotation forms gamma-ray bursts.

A typical core collapse supernova at the distance of η Carinae would peak at an apparent magnitude around −4, similar to Venus. A SLSN could be five magnitudes brighter, potentially the brightest supernova in recorded history (currently SN 1006). At 7,500 light-years from the star it is unlikely to directly affect terrestrial lifeforms, as they will be protected from gamma rays by the atmosphere and from some other cosmic rays by the magnetosphere. The main damage would be restricted to the upper atmosphere, the ozone layer, spacecraft, including satellites and any astronauts in space.

At least one paper has projected that complete loss of the Earth's ozone layer is a plausible consequence of a nearby supernova, which would result in a significant increase in UV radiation reaching Earth's surface from the Sun, but this would require a typical supernova to be closer than 50 light-years from Earth, and even a potential hypernova would need to be closer than η Carinae. Another analysis of the possible impact discusses more subtle effects from the unusual illumination, such as possible melatonin suppression with resulting insomnia and increased risk of cancer and depression. It concludes that a supernova of this magnitude would have to be much closer than η Carinae to have any type of major impact on Earth.

η Carinae is not expected to produce a gamma-ray burst, and its axis is not currently aimed near Earth. The Earth's atmosphere protects its inhabitants from all the radiation apart from UV light (it is opaque to gamma rays, which have to be observed using space telescopes). The main effect would result from damage to the ozone layer. η Carinae is too far away to do that even if it did produce a gamma-ray burst which was aimed at the Solar System.

== See also ==
- Lists of astronomical objects
