= Limb darkening =

Optical effect seen in stars

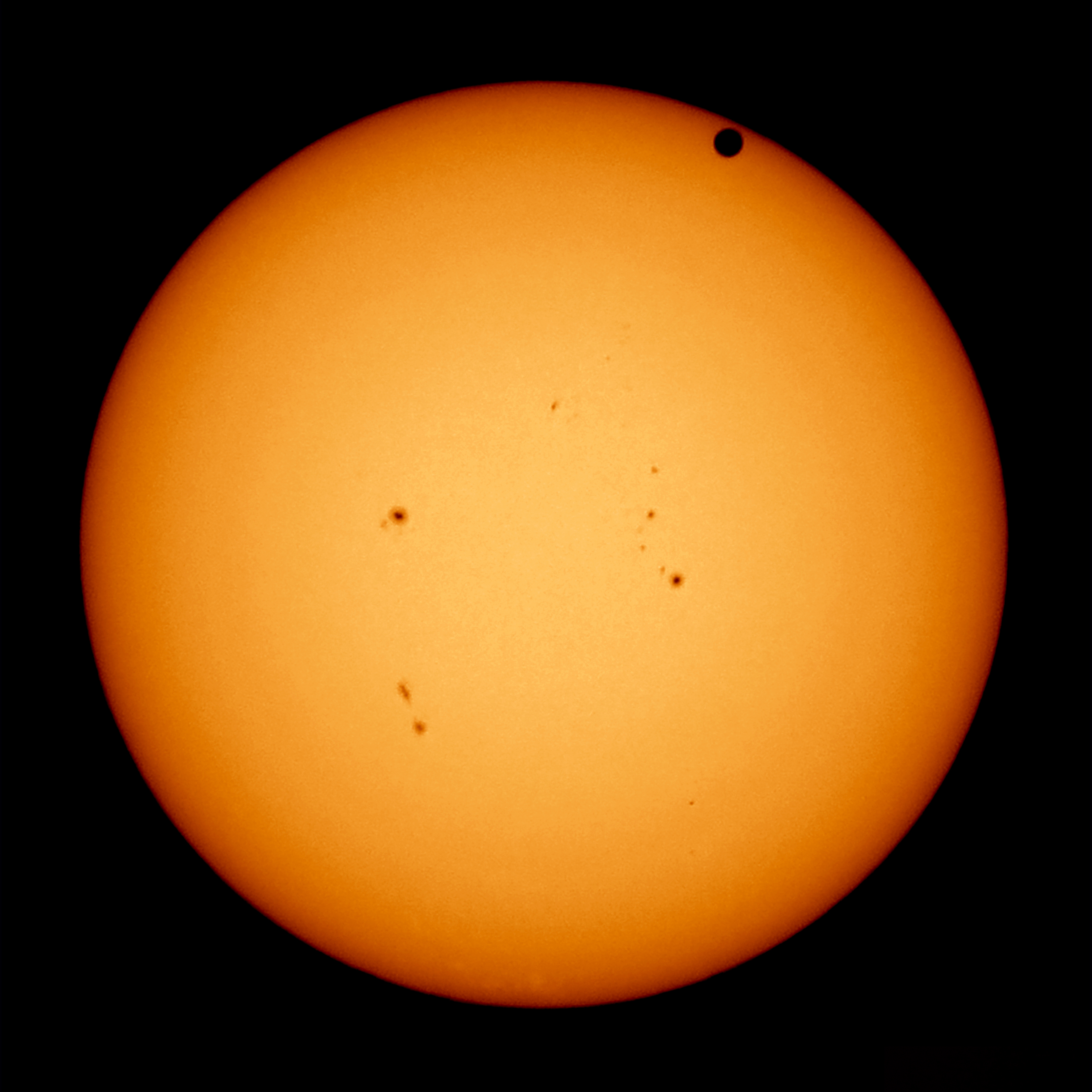
A filtered image of the Sun in visible light, showing the limb-darkening effect as a dimmer luminosity towards the edge or limb of the solar disk. The image was taken during the 2012 transit of Venus (seen here as the dark spot at the upper right).

Limb darkening is an optical effect seen in stars (including the Sun) and planets, where the central part of the disk appears brighter than the edge, or limb. Its understanding offered early solar astronomers an opportunity to construct models with such gradients. This encouraged the development of the theory of radiative transfer.

== Basic theory ==
An idealized case of limb darkening. The outer boundary is the radius at which photons emitted from the star are no longer absorbed. L is a distance for which the optical depth is unity. High-temperature photons emitted at A will just barely escape from the star, as will the low-temperature photons emitted at B. This drawing is not to scale. For example, for the Sun, L would be only a few hundred km.

Optical depth, a measure of the opacity of an object or part of an object, combines with effective temperature gradients inside the star to produce limb darkening. The light seen is approximately the integral of all emission along the line of sight modulated by the optical depth to the viewer (i.e. 1/e times the emission at 1 optical depth, 1/e^{2} times the emission at 2 optical depths, etc.). Near the center of the star, optical depth is effectively infinite, causing approximately constant brightness. However, the effective optical depth decreases with increasing radius due to lower gas density and a shorter line of sight distance through the star, producing a gradual dimming, until it becomes zero at the apparent edge of the star.

The effective temperature of the photosphere also decreases with increasing distance from the center of the star. The radiation emitted from a gas is approximately black-body radiation, the intensity of which is proportional to the fourth power of the temperature. Therefore, even in line of sight directions where the optical depth is effectively infinite, the emitted energy comes from cooler parts of the photosphere, resulting in less total energy reaching the viewer.

The temperature in the atmosphere of a star does not always decrease with increasing height. For certain spectral lines, the optical depth is greatest in regions of increasing temperature. In this scenario, the phenomenon of "limb brightening" is seen instead. In the Sun, the existence of a temperature minimum region means that limb brightening should start to dominate at far-infrared or radio wavelengths. Above the lower atmosphere, and well above the temperature-minimum region, the Sun is surrounded by the million-kelvin solar corona. For most wavelengths this region is optically thin, i.e. has small optical depth, and must, therefore, be limb-brightened if it is spherically symmetric.

== Calculation of limb darkening ==
Limb darkening geometry. The star is centered at O and has radius R. The observer is at point P a distance r from the center of the star, and is looking at point S on the surface of the star. From the point of view of the observer, S is at an angle θ from a line through the center of the star, and the edge or limb of the star is at angle Ω.

In the figure shown here, as long as the observer at point P is outside the stellar atmosphere, the intensity seen in the direction θ will be a function only of the angle of incidence ψ. This is most conveniently approximated as a polynomial in cos ψ:
$$\frac{I(\psi)}{I(0)} = \sum_{k=0}^N a_k \cos^k \psi,$$
where I(ψ) is the intensity seen at P along a line of sight forming angle ψ with respect to the stellar radius, and I(0) is the central intensity. In order that the ratio be unity for ψ = 0, we must have
$$\sum_{k=0}^N a_k = 1.$$

For example, for a Lambertian radiator (no limb darkening) we will have all a_{k} = 0 except a_{1} = 1. As another example, for the Sun at 550 nanometres (5.5×10^{−7} m), the limb darkening is well expressed by N = 2 and
$$\begin{align}
a_0 &= 1 - a_1 - a_2 = 0.3, \\
a_1 &= 0.93, \\
a_2 &= -0.23
\end{align}$$

The equation for limb darkening is sometimes more conveniently written as
$$\frac{I(\psi)}{I(0)} = 1 + \sum_{k=1}^N A_k (1 - \cos \psi)^k,$$
which now has N independent coefficients rather than N + 1 coefficients that must sum to unity.

The a_{k} constants can be related to the A_{k} constants. For N = 2,
$$\begin{align}
A_1 &= - (a_1 + 2a_2), \\
A_2 &= a_2.
\end{align}$$

For the Sun at 550 nm, we then have
$$\begin{align}
A_1 &= -0.47,\\
A_2 &= -0.23.
\end{align}$$

This model gives an intensity at the edge of the Sun's disk of only 30% of the intensity at the center of the disk.

We can convert these formulas to functions of θ by using the substitution
$$\cos \psi =
\frac{\sqrt{\cos^2 \theta - \cos^2 \Omega}}{\sin \Omega} = \sqrt{1 - \left(\frac{\sin \theta}{\sin \Omega}\right)^2},$$
where Ω is the angle from the observer to the limb of the star. For small θ we have
$$\cos\psi \approx \sqrt{1 - \left(\frac{\theta}{\sin \Omega}\right)^2}.$$

We see that the derivative of cos ψ is infinite at the edge.

The above approximation can be used to derive an analytic expression for the ratio of the mean intensity to the central intensity. The mean intensity I_{m} is the integral of the intensity over the disk of the star divided by the solid angle subtended by the disk:
$$I_m = \frac{\int I(\psi)\,\mathrm d\omega}{\int \mathrm d\omega},$$

where dω = sin θ dθ dφ is a solid angle element, and the integrals are over the disk: 0 ≤ φ ≤ 2π and 0 ≤ θ ≤ Ω. We may rewrite this as
$$I_m = \frac{\int_{\cos\Omega}^1 I(\psi) \,\mathrm d\cos\theta}{\int_{\cos\Omega}^1 \mathrm d\cos\theta} =
\frac{\int_{\cos\Omega}^1 I(\psi) \,\mathrm d\cos\theta}{1 - \cos\Omega}.$$

Although this equation can be solved analytically, it is rather cumbersome. However, for an observer at infinite distance from the star, $\mathrm d\cos\theta$ can be replaced by $\sin^2\Omega \cos\psi \,\mathrm d\cos\psi$, so we have
$$I_m = \frac{\int_0^1 I(\psi) \cos\psi \,\mathrm d\cos\psi}{\int_0^1 \cos\psi \,d\cos\psi} = 2\int_0^1 I(\psi) \cos\psi \,\mathrm d\cos\psi,$$
which gives
$$\frac{I_m}{I(0)} = 2 \sum_{k=0}^N \frac{a_k}{k + 2}.$$

For the Sun at 550 nm, this says that the average intensity is 80.5% of the intensity at the center.
