= Solar radius =

Unit of measurement

Conversion of nominal solar radius
1 R_{☉} =		Units
Decimal	Scientific notation	Units
695700000	6.95700×10^{8}	metres
695700	6.95700×10^{5}	kilometres
0.00465047	4.65047×10^{−3}	astronomical unit
432288	4.32288×10^{5}	miles
0.0000000735355	7.35355×10^{−8}	light-year
0.0000000225461	2.25461×10^{−8}	parsec
2.32061	2.32061×10^{0}	light-seconds

A solar radius is a unit of distance, commonly understood as 695,700 km and expressed as $R_{\odot}$, used mostly to express the size of an astronomical objects relative to that of the Sun, or their distance from it. This length is also called the nominal solar radius. The sun's actual radius, from which the unit of measurement is derived, is usually calculated as the radius from the sun's center out to the layer in the Sun's photosphere where the optical depth equals 2/3. One solar radius can be described as follows:
$$1\,R_{\odot} = 6.957\times 10^8 \hbox{ m}$$
This is an approximation: both because such distance is difficult to measure and can be measured in various ways, and because the sun is not a perfectly spherical object itself, and thus the actual radius varies depending on the point(s) measured and modality of measurement employed.

695,700 kilometres (432,300 miles) is approximately 10 times the average radius of Jupiter; 109 times the 6378 km radius of the Earth at its equator; and ${1 \over 215}$ or 0.0047 of an astronomical unit, the approximate average distance between Earth and the Sun. The solar radius to the sun's poles and that to the equator differ slightly due to the Sun's rotation, which induces an oblateness in the order of 10 parts per million.

The solar diameter is double the solar radius.

== Measurements ==
Evolution of the solar luminosity, radius and effective temperature compared to the present-day Sun. After Ribas (2009)

The uncrewed SOHO spacecraft was used to measure the radius of the Sun by timing transits of Mercury across the surface during 2003 and 2006. The result was a measured radius of 696,342 ± 65 kilometres (432,687 ± 40 miles).

Haberreiter, Schmutz & Kosovichev (2008) determined the radius corresponding to the solar photosphere to be 695,660 ± 140 kilometres (432,263 ± 87 miles). This new value is consistent with helioseismic estimates; the same study showed that previous estimates using inflection point methods had been overestimated by approximately 300 km (190 mi).

== Nominal solar radius ==
In 2015, the International Astronomical Union passed Resolution B3, which defined a set of nominal conversion constants for stellar and planetary astronomy. Resolution B3 defined the nominal solar radius (symbol $R^{N}_{\odot}$) to be equal to exactly 695700 km. The nominal value, which is the rounded value, within the 140 km uncertainty band given by Haberreiter, Schmutz & Kosovichev (2008), was adopted to help astronomers avoid confusion when quoting stellar radii in units of the Sun's radius, even when future observations will likely refine the Sun's actual photospheric radius (which is currently only known to about an accuracy of ±100–200 km).

== Examples ==
Solar radii as units of distance measurement are common especially when describing the paths of spacecraft moving close to the sun. Two such spacecraft in the 2010s include:

- Solar Orbiter (which flew as close as 45 R_{☉} to the sun)
- Parker Solar Probe (which flew as close as 9 R_{☉} to the sun)

Radius of other objects relative to the Sun's radius
Name	Radius (Solar radius)	Radius (kilometers)
Milky Way	5.94×10^{11}	4.134×10^{17}
WOH G64 A	1,540	1,071,378,000
UY Scuti	909	632,400,000
Betelgeuse	764	531,500,000
Antares A	680	473,076,000
Rigel A	74.1	51,550,000
Aldebaran	45.1	31,375,000
Arcturus	25.4	17,670,000
Pollux	9.06	6,300,000
Sirius A	1.711	1,190,350
Sun	1	695,700
Proxima Centauri	0.1542	107,275
Jupiter	0.1028	71,492
Saturn	0.0866	60,268
Uranus	0.03673	25,559
Neptune	0.03559	24,764
Earth	0.009168	6,378
Venus	0.00869	6,051.8
Mars	0.00488	3,396.19
Mercury	0.0035	2,440.53
Moon	0.0025	1,738.1
Pluto	0.0017	1,188.3

== See also ==
- Astronomical unit
- Earth radius
- Jupiter radius
- List of largest stars
- Orders of magnitude (length)
- Solar luminosity
- Solar mass
- Solar parallax
