= Homunculus Nebula =

Bipolar emission nebula in the constellation Carina

Emission nebula
- Reflection nebula
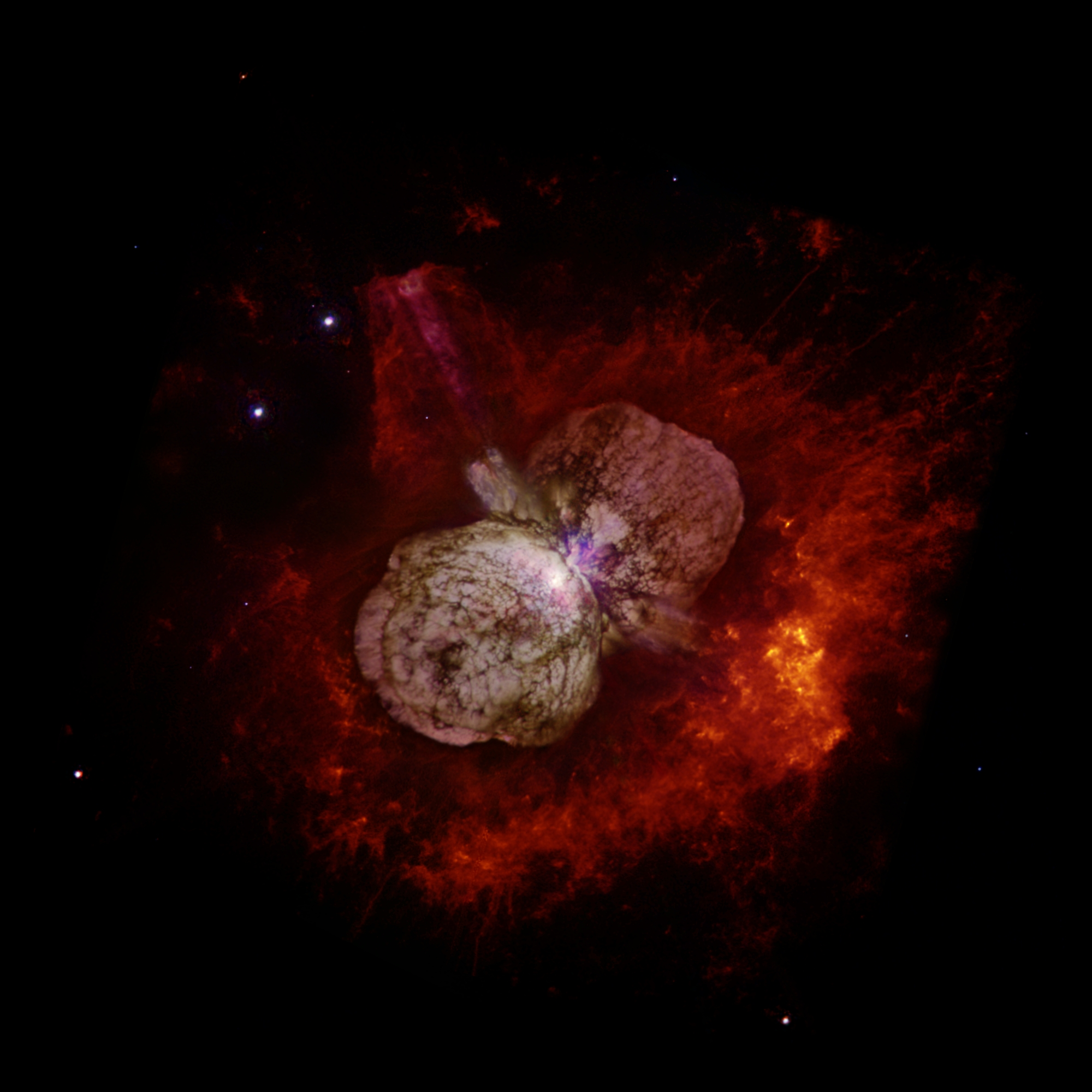

Observation data: J2000 epoch
- Right ascension: 10^{h} 45^{m} 03.6^{s}
- Declination: −59° 41′ 04″
- Distance: 7,500 ly
- Apparent magnitude (V): 6.21 (-0.8–7.9) (including the central star)
- Apparent dimensions (V): 18"
- Constellation: Carina

Physical characteristics
- Radius: 0.29 ly
- Notable features: Bipolar nebula

The Homunculus Nebula is a bipolar emission and reflection nebula surrounding the massive star system Eta Carinae, about 7,500 light-years (2,300 parsecs) from Earth. The nebula is embedded within the much larger Carina Nebula, a large star-forming H II region. From the Latin homunculus meaning Little Man, the nebula consists of gas which was ejected from Eta Carinae during the Great Eruption, which occurred ~7,500 years before it was observed on Earth, from 1838 to 1845. It also contains dust which absorbs much of the light from the extremely luminous central stellar system and re-radiates it as infra-red (IR). It is the brightest object in the sky at mid-IR wavelengths.

Within the Homunculus is a smaller Little Homunculus, and within that a shell of shocked material from stellar winds that has been called Baby Homunculus.

== Observational history ==
In 1914, Eta Carinae was reported to have a faint companion and also to be non-stellar. Observations in 1944 and 1945 showed a somewhat elongated nebulosity around 5″ wide and 10″ long. It was measured to be expanding at a rate which was consistent with having originated in an explosion in the mid 19th century. At that time the shape of the nebula showed a central bulge with a single large lump to the northwest and two smaller extensions to the southeast, which was described as a Homunculus. Other observations at around the same time described a strongly orange central region in a larger fainter green nebulosity. One paper described it as looking like a "red spade-beard".

== Shape ==
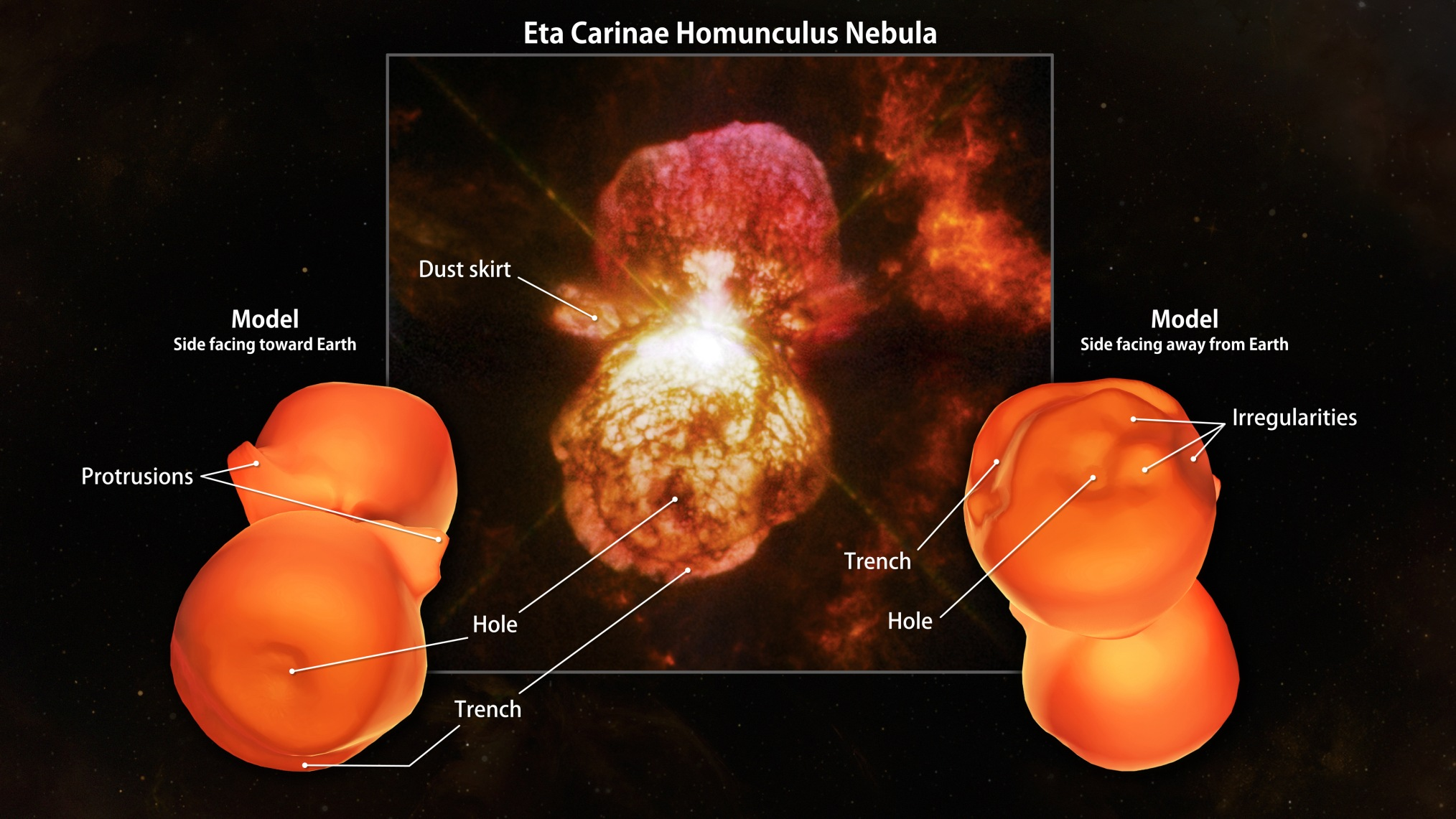
A 3D model of the Homunculus Nebula.

The Homunculus consists of two lobes, referred to as northwest (NW) and southeast (SE) based on their orientation as seen from Earth. Each is approximately 7″ wide by 5″ long. There is also a ragged equatorial skirt of material which can be seen faintly in deep images at certain wavelengths. The lobes are mostly hollow with the material strongly concentrated towards the poles.

The equatorial skirt appears to contain material of the same age and younger than the lobes. It contains a much smaller mass of material than the lobes, shining mainly by reflected light which escapes most easily at equatorial latitudes. There is less dust and little molecular hydrogen compared to the lobes.

The bipolar nebula is angled so that the NW lobe is further away from Earth than the SE lobe is. The whole nebula is expanding so that the SE lobe is blue-shifted and the NW lobe is red-shifted, relative to the central source. The lobes contain the majority of the material in the Homunculus Nebula, in relatively thin shells concentrated towards the poles. The shells consist of two components, an inner warm region and a more massive outer cool skin. The shells are smooth and thin suggesting they were ejected in as little as five years, but there are streaks of thicker dust detectable within the shells.

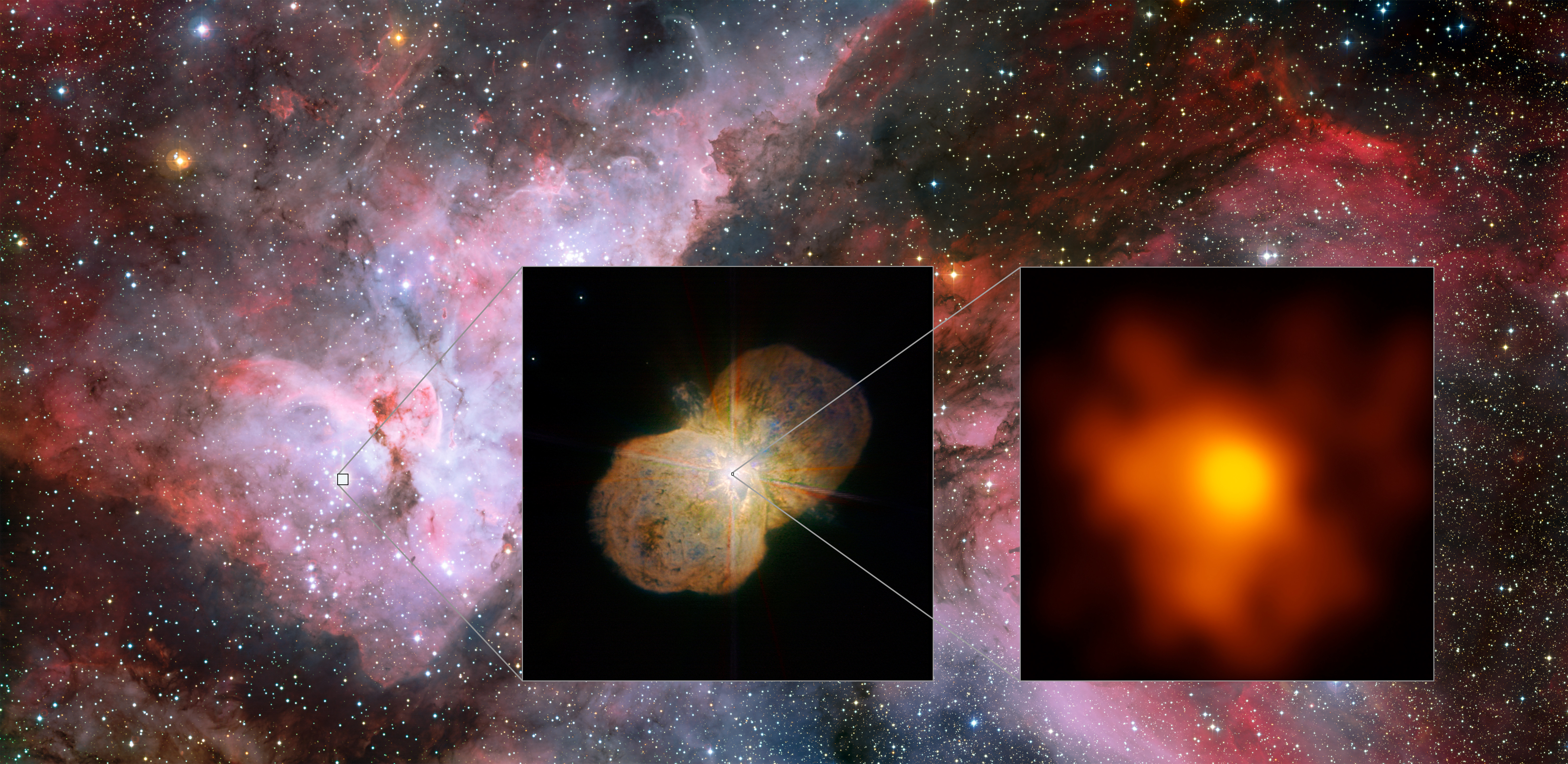
Detailed look on Eta Carinae. Carina Nebula (left), Homunculus Nebula (center), and high resolution image of Eta Carinae (right).

The Homunculus Nebula imaged with an 8" untracked Dobsonian telescope, showing the expansion of its lobes between 2021 and 2025.

Each lobe has polar "hole" although it is not known whether it is an actual gap in the shell of the lobe or just a deep indentation. Surrounding each polar hole is a "trench". The trenches are visible as approximate semicircles centred on the axis of the lobes but may form complete circles. There are other smaller irregular indentations and protrusions to the lobes, which are symmetrical with the same features appearing on each lobe. These include flattened protrusions at about 10° latitude, one on each lobe (labeled "Protrusions" in the illustrated model), with other smaller protrusions near the equatorial skirt.

The mass of the nebula cannot be determined directly. However, the amount of dust can be measured fairly accurately and estimates of the gas to dust ratio used to calculate the total mass. The total dust mass is calculated at 0.4 M_{☉}, leading to estimates that up to 40 M_{☉} of gas are contained in the Homunculus itself. Nearly as much material is detected within outer ejecta, which formed earlier, but within the last thousand years. Older calculations had produced consensus estimates of 10-15 M_{☉}

== Weigelt Blobs ==
Early speckle interferometry showed that the central region of the Homunculus contains four point-like sources, originally designated A1, A2, A3, and A4. The four speckle objects were later referred to as A, B, C, and D. Higher resolution studies showed that only the brightest source A was truly stellar, and the other three were small nebular condensations. The three Weigelt Blobs are visible primarily in light directly reflected from the Eta Carinae stars. The blobs are believed to lie near the equatorial plane of the stellar system, but their origin is unclear. Their speed has been measured, but within uncertainties they could have been emitted in the 1890 outburst or a 1941 event. The situation is complicated further by the likely acceleration of their slow movement due to the intense stellar winds.

== Spectrum ==
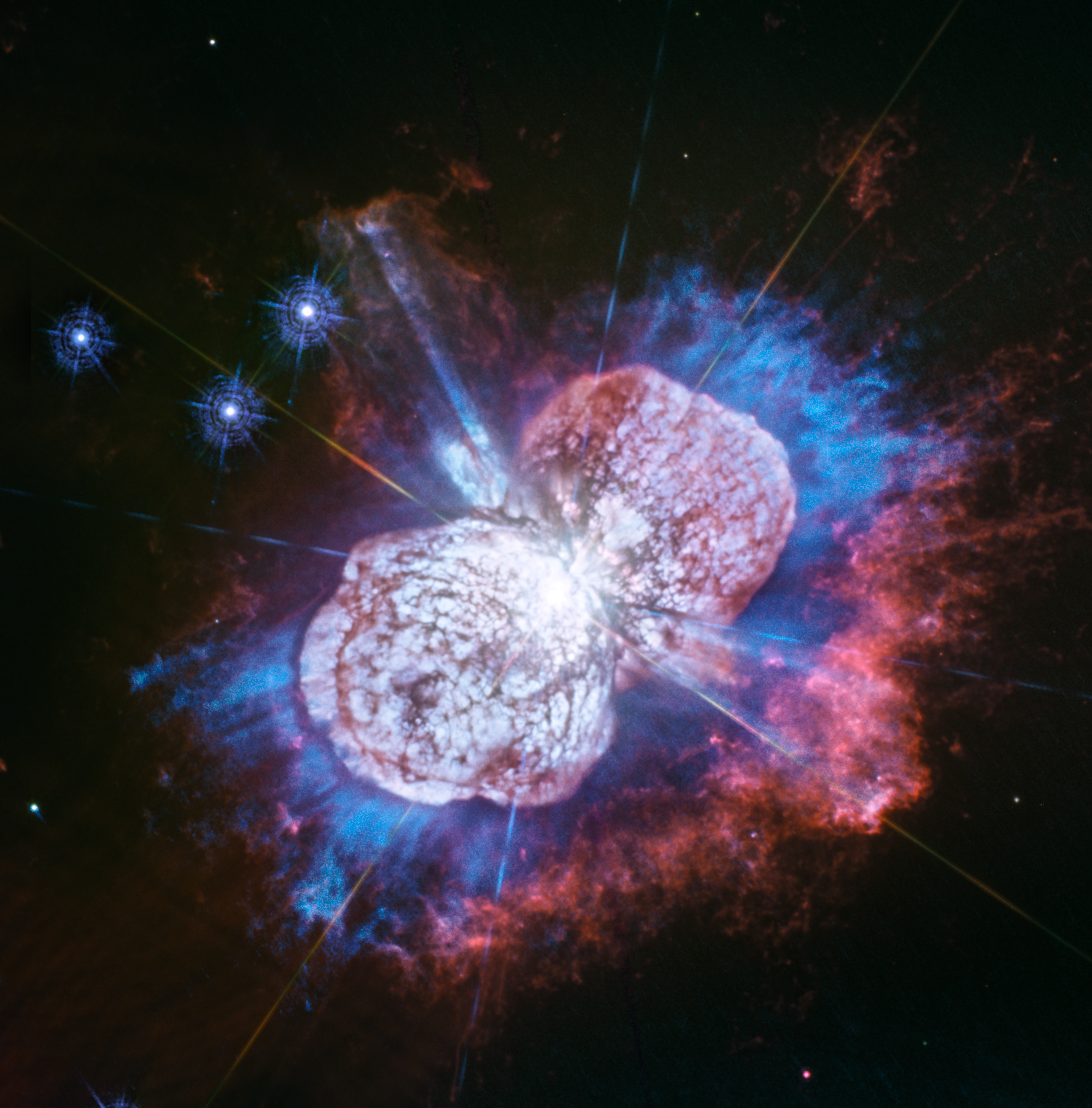
Ultraviolet image of Homunculus Nebula taken by Hubble

The spectrum of the Homunculus is complex, consisting of reflected, thermal, and emission components at wavelengths across the electromagnetic spectrum. The dominant feature is blackbody radiation from dust heated by the stars within. Overlaid on this is some light from the stars themselves reflected mostly from dense features within the nebulosity, showing strong visual and UV spectral lines in emission. There are also emission lines from ionised gas where it collides with slower moving material or is excited by high energy electromagnetic radiation from the stars. The ionisation emission is similar to a planetary nebula but at lower levels of ionisation due to the lower temperatures of the central stars. The strongest lines are [Fe ii] and [N ii], similar to those from the stellar winds of the stars themselves, but with narrower profiles.

Shock waves at the outer edge of the ejecta are heated to millions of kelvin and emit x-ray radiation. The lobes of the Homunculus emit copious radio waves, including emission in the 21 cm line of hydrogen.

The reflected spectrum of the Homunculus lobes varies with position, due to the central star emitting different radiation at different latitudes on its surface. This is the only star for which such an effect can be observed.

== Formation ==
The Homunculus was ejected in an enormous outburst from Eta Carinae. Light from this event reached Earth in 1841, when Eta Carinae briefly became the second-brightest star in the sky, after Sirius; the ejected gas and dust have since obscured much of its light. The near-supernova explosion produced two polar lobes, and a large but thin equatorial disk, all moving outward at up to 670 km/s (1,500,000 mph).

The Homunculus Nebula is a virtually unique structure, believed to result from the extremely young age. This means that the shape and structure is almost entirely due to the original eruption rather than the interaction with surrounding interstellar material. Suggestions that the waist between the two lobes was formed by "pinching" from a dense surrounding material have been disproved, and the bipolar shells are now believed to be caused by concentrated polar outflows of material, with the equatorial skirt formed by breakout of faster ejected material through the thinnest parts of the shells. The ejection of material preferentially along the axis of rotation of the stars, or of the binary orbit, may be due to the rotation of Eta Carinae A itself resulting in stronger mass loss towards the poles.

The thinness of the bipolar shells argues for their ejection within approximately five years. Irregularities in the otherwise very smooth structure of the shells are conjectured to result from interactions between the winds of the two central stars, and from their orbital motion.

Analysis of the expansion of the nebula has given a time for its formation at 1847.1±0.8 yr. This date is inconsistent with the peaks in brightness and with estimates of the periastron passage of the secondary star.

== Distance ==
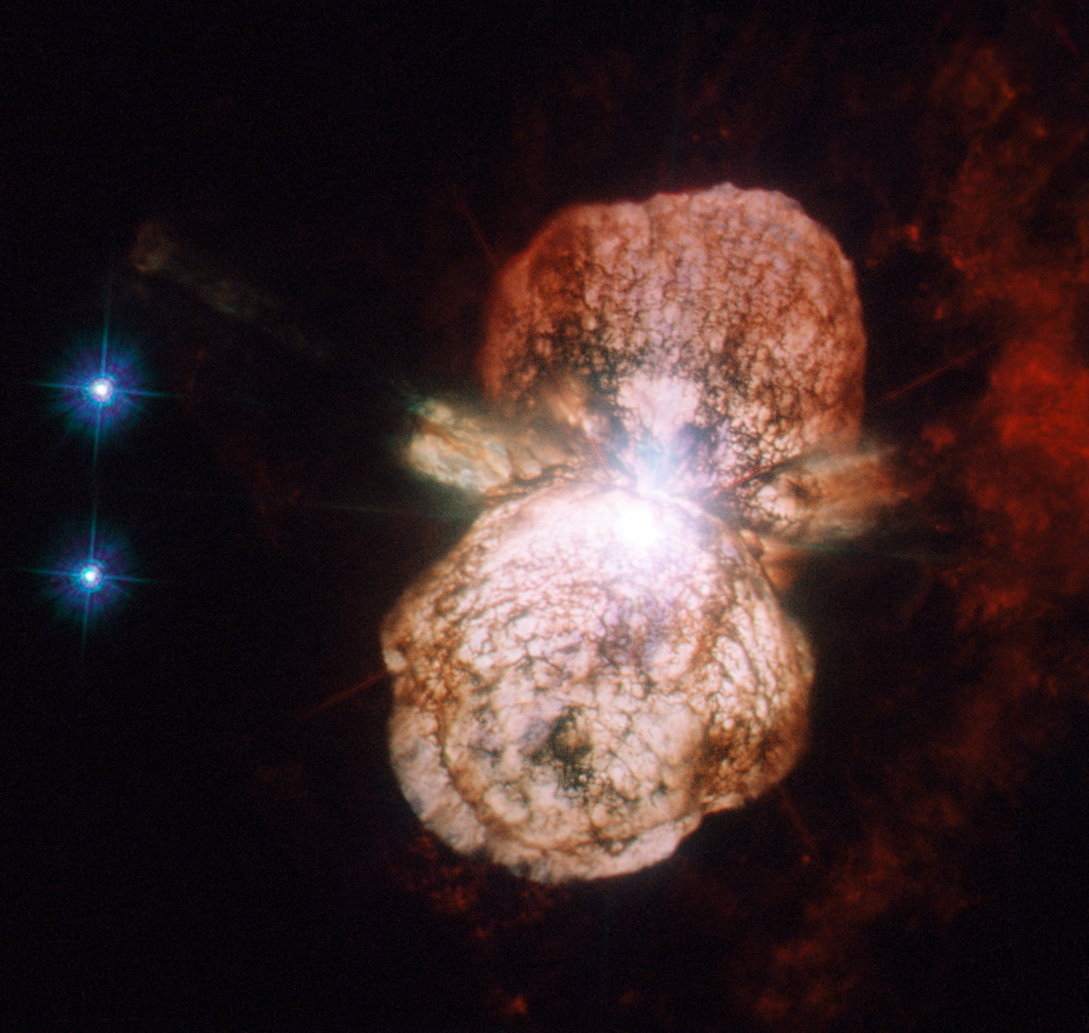
Homunculus Nebula around Eta Carinae (HST UV and visual image)

The Homunculus and Eta Carinae are assumed to be at approximately the same distance as Trumpler 16 and the Carina Nebula, but the distances to these objects are not known with any great accuracy. Instead, the distance of the Homunculus Nebula itself can be calculated using measurements of its expansion. The velocity of particular locations within the thin shell of the Homunculus lobes can be measured using the doppler shift of the spectral lines at that point, assuming the lobes are symmetrical. There are two different doppler shifts visible in the spectrum: one for direct emission lines; and one for reflected lines from Eta Carinae A. The direct line doppler shift gives the expansion velocity of the shell project onto the line of sight. Assuming an origin in Eta Carinae's Great Eruption and a constant expansion velocity, this gives the linear distance of the shell from the central star projected along the line of sight. The difference between the reflected line doppler shift velocity and the direct line velocity gives the distance of the shell from the central star, again assuming expansion at constant velocity since the Great Eruption.

Observations of the spectrum of the Homunculus at a particular angular distance from the central star have shown the actual linear distance of that point from the central star, which defines the distance. Values obtained using this method are around 2.3 kpc with a margin of error around 100 pc.

The same calculations also return the inclination of the axis of the Homunculus relative to the line of sight. This turns out to be 41°, or 49° relative to the plane of the sky, which means it is slightly more "end on" than "side on".
