= Eta Carinids =

Meteor shower lasting from January 14 to 27 each year

The Eta Carinids are a meteor shower lasting from January 14 to 27 each year, peaking on January 21. C. S. Nilsson of the Adelaide Observatory discovered them in 1961 in Australia. Roughly two to three meteors occur per hour at its maximum. It gets its name from the radiant which is close to the stellar system Eta Carinae.
