= Optical depth (astrophysics) =

Concept in astrophysics regarding radiation transparency

Optical depth in astrophysics refers to a measure of transparency for electromagnetic radiation within an astrophysical medium. Quantified by the symbol $\tau$, it measures how much a beam of light is attenuated due to absorption and scattering as it travels through a physical distance $z$.

The optical depth at a given frequency $\nu$ is defined as the integral of the extinction coefficient $\alpha_\nu$ (the sum of absorption and scattering coefficients) along the radiation path:

$\tau_\nu(z) \equiv \int_0^z \alpha_\nu(z') \, dz' = \sigma_\nu N,$

where $\sigma_\nu$ is the extinction cross-section per particle and $N$ is the column density (the number of target particles per unit area along the line of sight). Large values ($\tau_\nu \gg 1$) indicate an optically thick medium with high obscuration, whereas small values ($\tau_\nu \ll 1$) correspond to an optically thin medium where radiation passes through largely unhindered.

In radiative transfer, the attenuation of monochromatic intensity $I_\nu$ along a path is described by the Beer–Lambert law:

$$I_\nu(z) = I_{\nu,0} e^{-\tau_\nu}$$

Alternatively, the extinction coefficient $\alpha$ can be related to the imaginary part of the complex refractive index, $\kappa$, by:

$$\alpha = \frac{4 \pi \kappa}{\lambda_0},$$

where $\lambda_0$ is the vacuum wavelength of the incident light.

== Astrophysical applications ==
Optical depth is a fundamental parameter used across several areas of astrophysics beyond stellar interiors:

- Interstellar medium (ISM) and nebulae: Extinction by interstellar dust clouds is quantified by optical depth. Photons passing through cold molecular clouds undergo absorption and scattering, making background stars appear dimmer and redder (interstellar reddening).
- Accretion disks: In accretion disk theory (such as around active galactic nuclei or compact objects), the optical depth determines whether heat generated by viscous dissipation can escape efficiently via radiation or remains trapped within an optically thick flow.
- Planetary rings and atmospheres: The transparency of planetary rings (e.g., Saturn's rings) and exoplanetary atmospheres during transits is measured using optical depth, allowing astronomers to infer ring mass density, scale height, and atmospheric composition.

== The Eddington approximation and the depth of the photosphere ==
In stellar astrophysics, defining the boundary of a star's interior is non-trivial because stellar atmospheres lack a sharp physical surface. Astronomers conventionally define optical depth in a stellar atmosphere along the radial line of sight, integration measured inward from the outer boundary ($\tau = 0$):

$$d\tau_\nu = -\kappa_\nu \rho \, dr$$

where $\kappa_\nu$ is the mass absorption coefficient (opacity) and $\rho$ is the mass density.

To determine the visible surface of a star, astrophysicists frequently employ the Eddington approximation. Devised by Sir Arthur Eddington, this approximation assumes a "gray" atmosphere—where opacity is independent of frequency ($\kappa_\nu = \kappa$). Under radiative equilibrium, the local physical temperature $T$ at a given optical depth $\tau$ relates to the star's effective temperature $T_e$ by:

$$T^4 = \frac{3}{4}T_e^4\left(\tau + \frac{2}{3}\right)$$

This relation demonstrates that at an optical depth of $\tau = 2/3$, the local physical temperature $T$ equals the star's effective temperature $T_e$. Thus, the photosphere of a star is formally defined as the atmospheric layer down to $\tau \approx 2/3$, corresponding to the mean depth from which thermal photons escape into space without further significant absorption or scattering.
