= NGC 932 =

Galaxy in the constellation Aries

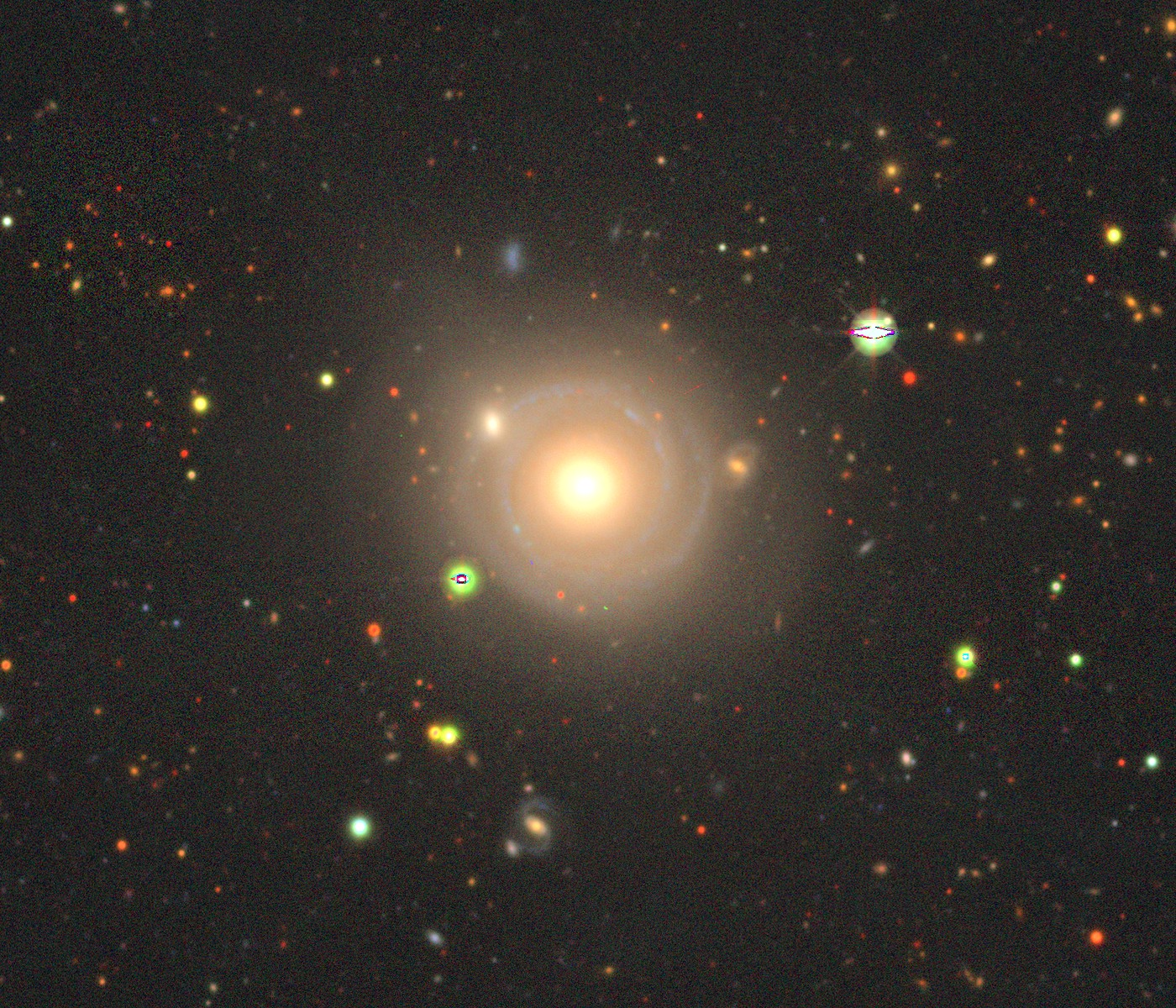
- NGC 932 imaged by Legacy Surveys

Observation data (J2000 epoch)
- Constellation: Aries
- Right ascension: 02^{h} 27^{m} 54.7033^{s}
- Declination: +20° 19′ 57.169″
- Redshift: 0.013606±0.00000700
- Heliocentric radial velocity: 4,079±2 km/s
- Distance: 184.6 ± 12.9 Mly (56.59 ± 3.97 Mpc)
- Group or cluster: NGC 976 group (LGG 61)
- Apparent magnitude (V): 13.34

Characteristics
- Type: SAa
- Size: ~112,900 ly (34.60 kpc) (estimated)
- Apparent size (V): 1.9′ × 1.6′

Other designations
- 2MASX J02275468+2019575, UGC 1931, MCG +03-07-014, PGC 9379, CGCG 462-014

NGC 932 is a spiral galaxy in the constellation of Aries. Its velocity with respect to the cosmic microwave background is 3,837±17 km/s, which corresponds to a Hubble distance of 184.6 ± 12.9 Mly (56.59 ± 3.97 Mpc). It was discovered by German-British astronomer William Herschel on 29 November 1785. There has been a longstanding confusion between this galaxy and NGC 930, which is a nonexistent object.

== NGC 976 group ==
NGC 932 is part of the NGC 976 group (also known as LGG 61). This galaxy group contains at least 12 galaxies, including IC 1797, IC 1801, NGC 924, NGC 935, NGC 938, NGC 976, UGC 1965, UGC 2032, UGC 2064, and PGC 9313.

== Supernova ==
One supernova has been observed in NGC 932:

- SN 1992bf (Type I, mag. 17) was discovered by Jean Mueller on 2 October 1992.

== See also ==
- List of NGC objects (1–1000)
