= NGC 904 =

Elliptical galaxy in the constellation Aries

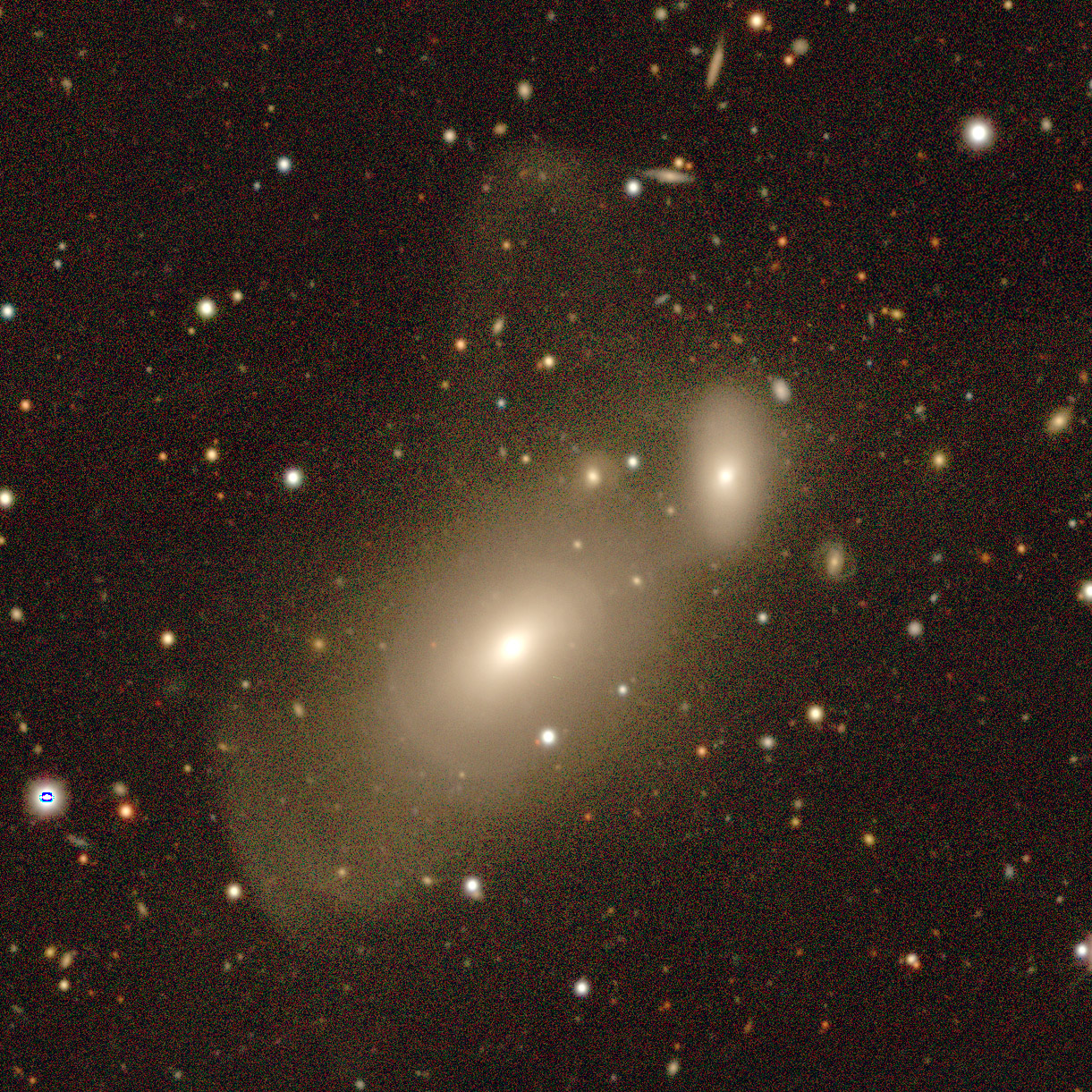
- legacy surveys image of NGC 903 and NGC 904 (left)

Observation data (J2000 epoch)
- Constellation: Aries
- Right ascension: 02^{h} 24^{m} 05.546^{s}
- Declination: +27° 20′ 32.97″
- Redshift: 0.017956
- Heliocentric radial velocity: 5335 km/s
- Distance: 234.9 Mly (72.02 Mpc)
- Apparent magnitude (B): 14.98

Characteristics
- Type: cE

Other designations
- UGC 1852, MCG +04-06-024, PGC 9112

NGC 904 is an elliptical galaxy in the constellation Aries. It is estimated to be 244 million light years from the Milky Way and has a diameter of approximately 85,000 ly. NGC 904 was discovered on 13 December 1884 by the astronomer Edouard Stephan.

== See also ==
- List of NGC objects (1–1000)
