= NGC 992 =

Spiral galaxy in the constellation Aries

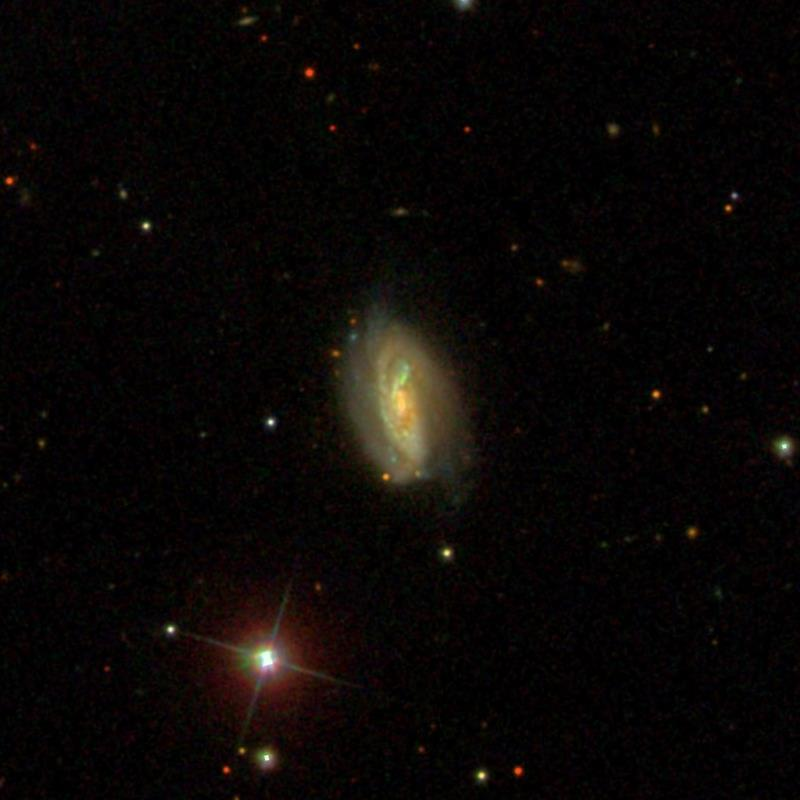
- SDSS image of NGC 992

Observation data (J2000 epoch)
- Constellation: Aries
- Right ascension: 02^{h} 37^{m} 25.491^{s}
- Declination: +21° 06′ 03.04″
- Redshift: 0.01376
- Heliocentric radial velocity: 4098 km/s
- Distance: 188.1 ± 13.2 Mly (57.67 ± 4.04 Mpc)
- Apparent magnitude (V): 15.13
- Apparent magnitude (B): 15.53

Characteristics
- Type: SBc

Other designations
- UGC 2103, MCG +03-07-035, PGC 9938

NGC 992 is a spiral galaxy in the constellation Aries and is estimated to be 188 million light years from the Milky Way. NGC 992 was discovered by astronomers Lewis A. Swift on September 6, 1886.

== See also ==
- List of NGC objects (1–1000)
