= NGC 794 =

Galaxy in the constellation Aries

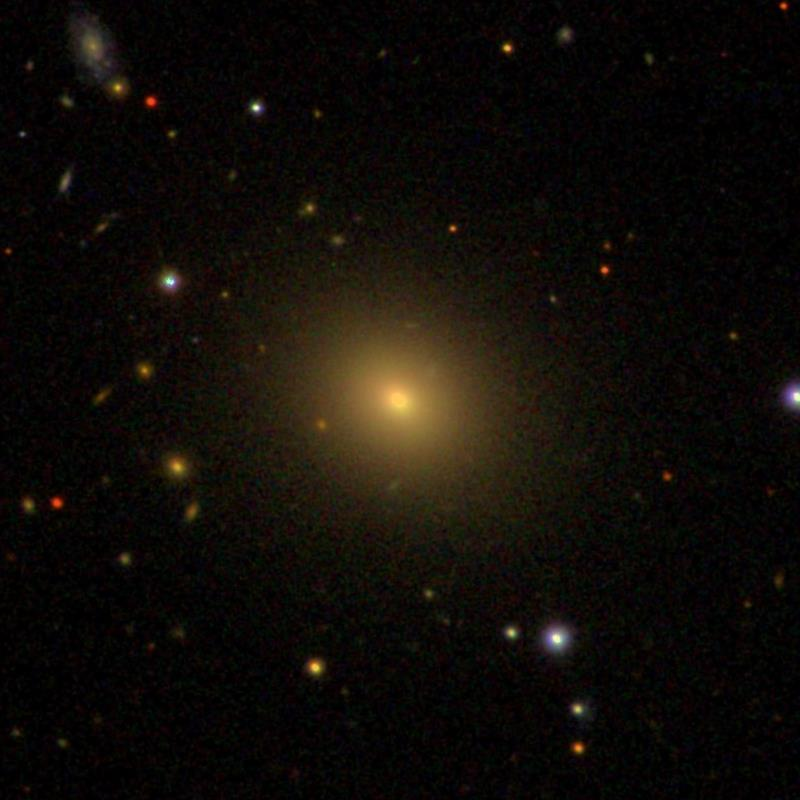

Observation data
- Constellation: Aries
- Right ascension: 02^{h} 03^{m} 54^{s}
- Declination: +18° 29′ 50″

NGC 794 is a lenticular galaxy in the constellation Aries about 383 million light-years away from the Milky Way. It was discovered on October 15, 1784 by the astronomer William Herschel.
