= NGC 900 =

Lenticular galaxy in the constellation Aries

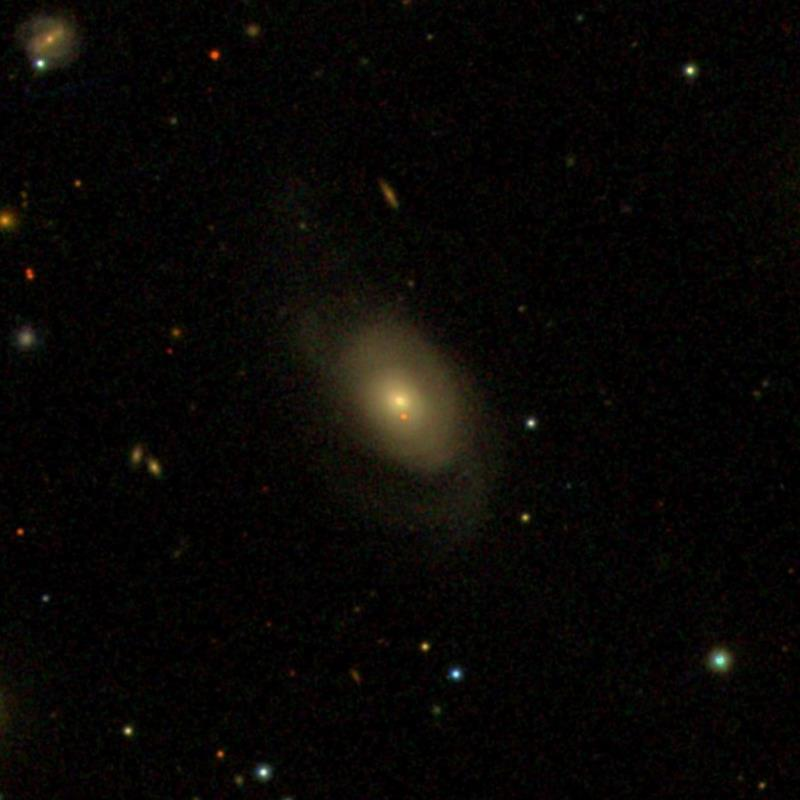
- SDSS image of NGC 900

Observation data (J2000 epoch)
- Constellation: Aries
- Right ascension: 02^{h} 23^{m} 32.18058^{s}
- Declination: +26° 30′ 41.6759″
- Redshift: 0.03254
- Heliocentric radial velocity: 9596 km/s
- Distance: 428.1 Mly (131.25 Mpc)
- Apparent magnitude (B): 15.0

Characteristics
- Type: S0

Other designations
- UGC 1843, MCG +04-06-020, PGC 9079

NGC 900 is a lenticular galaxy located in the constellation Aries about 430 million light-years from the Milky Way. It was discovered by the German astronomer Albert Marth in 1864.

== See also ==
- List of NGC objects (1–1000)
