= IC 167 =

Barred Spiral Galaxy in the constellation Aries

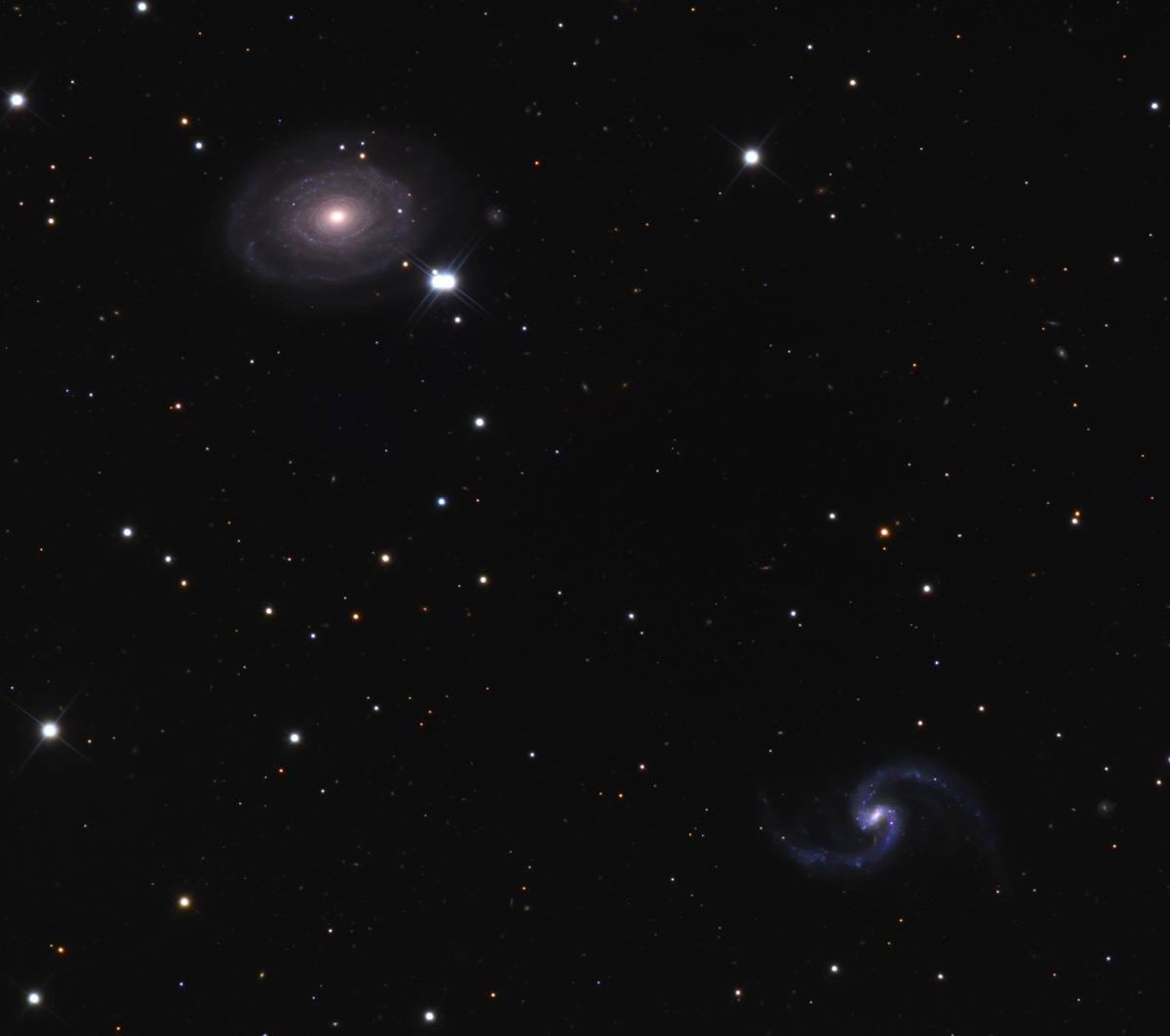
- NGC 691 (upper left) and IC 167 (lower right)

Observation data (J2000 epoch)
- Constellation: Aries
- Right ascension: 01^{h} 51^{m} 08.65^{s}
- Declination: +21° 54′ 44.8″
- Redshift: 0.00982 ± 0.00017
- Apparent magnitude (V): 14.0

Characteristics
- Type: SBc
- Apparent size (V): 3.09′ × 1.862′

Other designations
- Arp 31, LEDA 6833, MCG+04-05-021, Z 0148.3+2140, APG 31, 2MASX1 J0151084+215447, UGC 1313, Z 482-25, LCSB L76, 2MASX J01510855+2154461, UZC J015108.6+215445

IC 167 is a barred spiral galaxy in the constellation of Aries. It was first reported by Bigourdan in 1891 and included in Dreyer's first Index Catalogue.

== Galaxy group information ==
IC 167 is a member of the NGC 697 group. There is some evidence that IC 167 is interacting with nearby NGC 694 as they seem to share HI regions. The tidal warping of IC 167 also is indicative of an interaction with another galaxy. How long the interaction between these two galaxies has been occurring is the subject of current research.

IC 167 is considered to be part of a galaxy group known as NGC 691 Group or LGG 34. It has at least 10 members, which are NGC 680, NGC 691, NGC 697, NGC 694, UGC 1287, UGC 1294, UGC 1490, IC 163 and IC 167.
