= NGC 694 =

Spiral galaxy in the constellation Aries

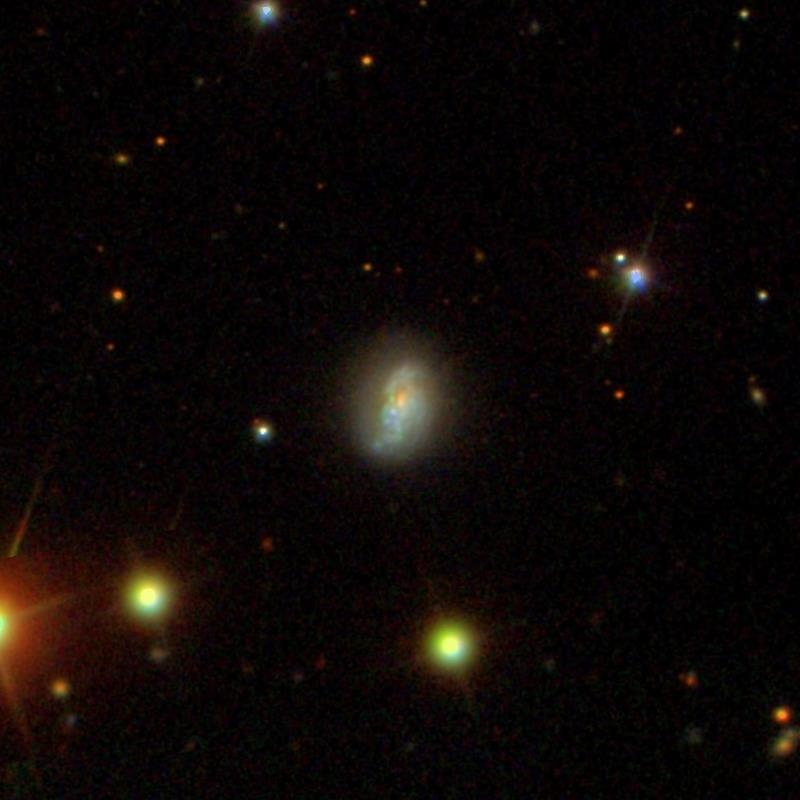
- NGC 694 (SDSS)

Observation data (J2000.0 epoch)
- Constellation: Aries
- Right ascension: 01^{h} 50^{m} 58.50^{s}
- Declination: +21° 59′ 51.00″
- Redshift: 0.009840
- Heliocentric radial velocity: 2950 ± 4 km/s
- Distance: 136 Mly
- Apparent magnitude (V): 13.30
- Apparent magnitude (B): 14.30

Characteristics
- Type: S0
- Apparent size (V): 0.6 x 0.4

Other designations
- UGC 1310, MCG +04-05-02, PGC 6816

NGC 694 is a spiral galaxy approximately 136 million light-years away from Earth in the constellation of Aries. It was discovered by German astronomer Heinrich Louis d'Arrest on December 2, 1861 with the 11-inch refractor at Copenhagen.

== Nearby galaxies ==
NGC 694 is a member of a small galaxy group known as the NGC 691 group, the main other members of which are NGC 680, NGC 691 and NGC 697. IC 167 lies 5.5 arcminutes to the south-southeast.

== Supernova SN 2014bu ==
One supernova has been observed in NGC 694:

- SN 2014bu was discovered by Berto Monard on June 17, 2014 . SN 2014bu had a magnitude of about 15.5 and was located at RA 01^{h} 50^{m} 58.45^{s}, DEC +21° 59′ 59.78″, J2000.0. It was classified as Type II-P supernova.

== Image gallery ==
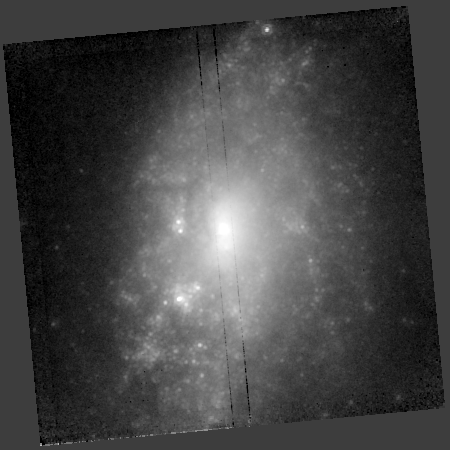
NGC 694 (NASA/ESA HST)

== See also ==
- List of NGC objects (1–1000)
