= NGC 677 =

Galaxy in Constellation of Aries

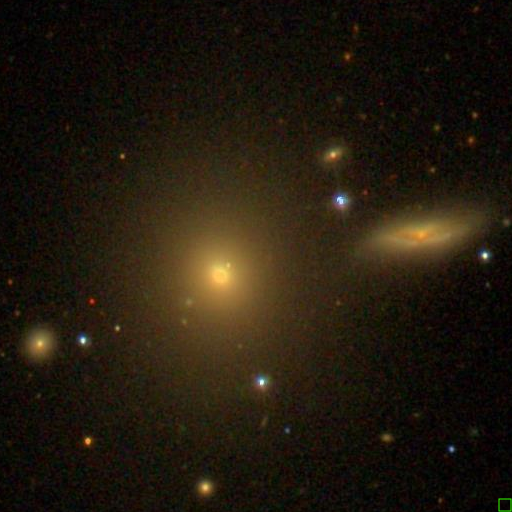
- SDSS image of NGC 677

Observation data (J2000 epoch)
- Constellation: Aries
- Right ascension: 01^{h} 49^{m} 14.050^{s}
- Declination: +13° 03′ 19.28″
- Redshift: 0.01693
- Heliocentric radial velocity: 5033 ± 3 km/s
- Distance: 221.6 Mly (67.95 Mpc)
- Apparent magnitude (V): 12.27
- Apparent magnitude (B): 13.26

Characteristics
- Type: E
- Apparent size (V): 2.0′ × 2.0′

Other designations
- UGC 1275, MCG +02-05-042, PGC 6673

NGC 677 is an elliptical galaxy located in the constellation Aries. It was discovered on September 25, 1886, by the astronomer Lewis A. Swift. It is located about 200 million light-years (70 megaparsecs) from Earth at the center of a rich galaxy cluster. It has a LINER nucleus.

According to A.M. Garcia, NGC 677 is a member of the NGC 673 Group (also known as LGG 31). This group contains at least 17 galaxies, including IC 156, IC 162, NGC 665, NGC 673, NGC 683, and 11 galaxies from the UGC catalogue.

== See also ==
- List of NGC objects (1–1000)
