= NGC 803 =

Spiral galaxy in the constellation Aries

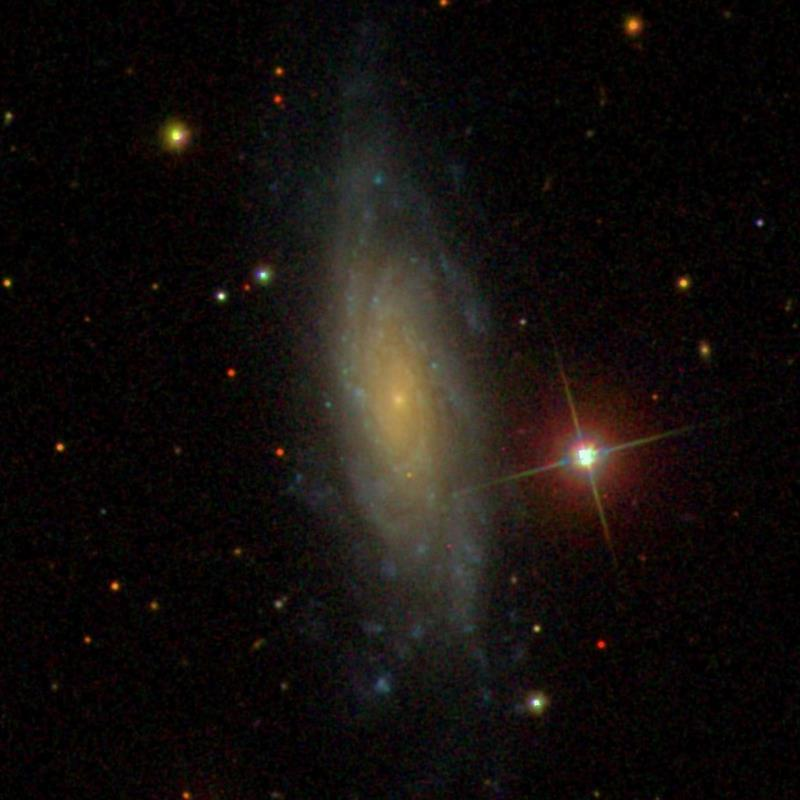
- SDSS image of NGC 803

Observation data (J2000 epoch)
- Constellation: Aries
- Right ascension: 02^{h} 03^{m} 44.701^{s}
- Declination: +16° 01′ 51.46″
- Redshift: 0.007002
- Heliocentric radial velocity: 2092 km/s
- Distance: 70.7 Mly (21.68 Mpc)
- Apparent magnitude (V): 12.41
- Apparent magnitude (B): 13.03

Characteristics
- Type: SA(s)c: edge-on

Other designations
- UGC 1554, MCG +03-06-028, PGC 7849

NGC 803 is a spiral galaxy located in the constellation Aries about 70 million light-years from the Milky Way. It was discovered by the German–British astronomer William Herschel in 1784.

== See also ==
- List of NGC objects (1–1000)

== Gallery ==
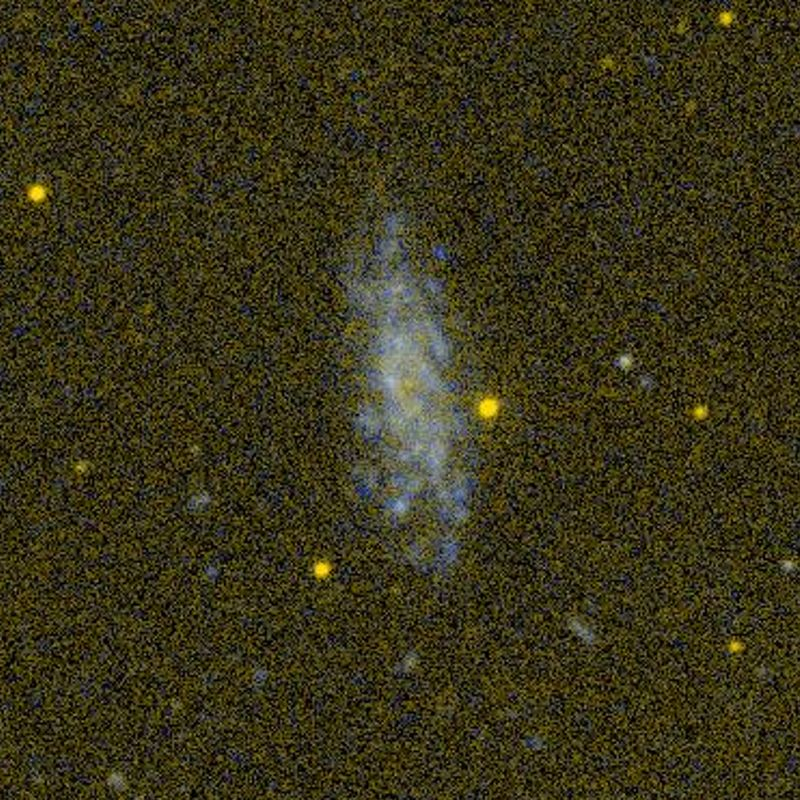
NGC 803 by GALEX

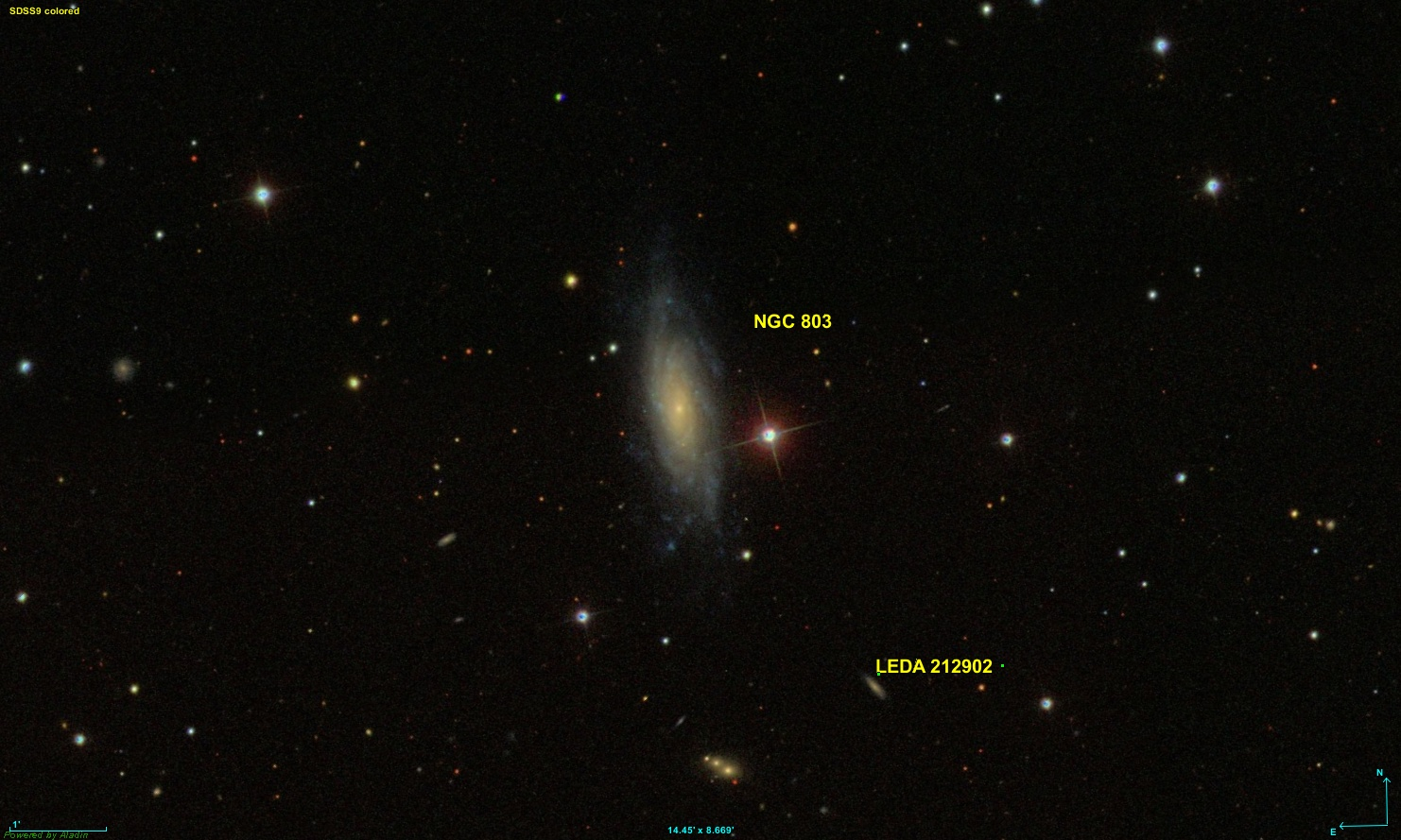
NGC 803 (SDSS)
