= NGC 916 =

Galaxy in the constellation Aries

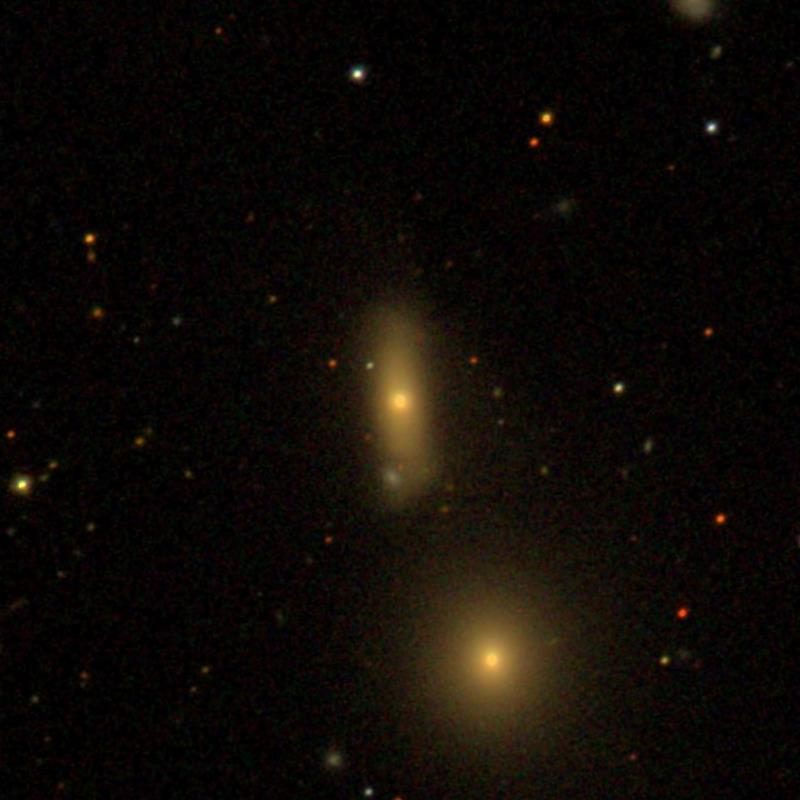

Observation data
- Constellation: Aries
- Right ascension: 02^{h} 27^{m} 18^{s}
- Declination: +27° 21′ 30″

NGC 916 is a lenticular galaxy in the constellation Aries about 422 million light-years away from the Milky Way. It forms a pair with NGC 915. It was discovered on September 5, 1864 by the astronomer Albert Marth.
