= NGC 781 =

Spiral galaxy in the constellation Aries

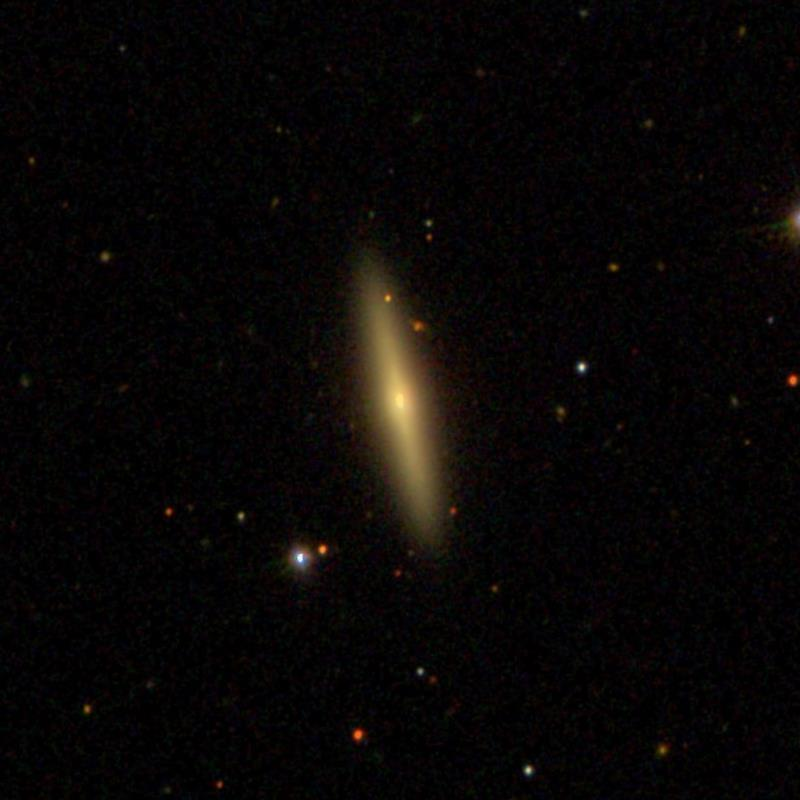
- SDSS image of NGC 781

Observation data (J2000 epoch)
- Constellation: Aries
- Right ascension: 02^{h} 00^{m} 08.97485^{s}
- Declination: +12° 39′ 22.0060″
- Redshift: 0.011631
- Heliocentric radial velocity: 3467 km/s
- Distance: 154.2 ± 10.9 Mly (47.29 ± 3.34 Mpc)
- Apparent magnitude (B): 14.00

Characteristics
- Type: S?

Other designations
- UGC 1482, MCG +02-06-010, PGC 7577

NGC 781 is a spiral galaxy in the constellation Aries. It is estimated to be about 154 million light years from the Milky Way and has a diameter of approximately 70,000 light years. NGC 781 was discovered on October 16, 1784 by the German-British astronomer William Herschel.

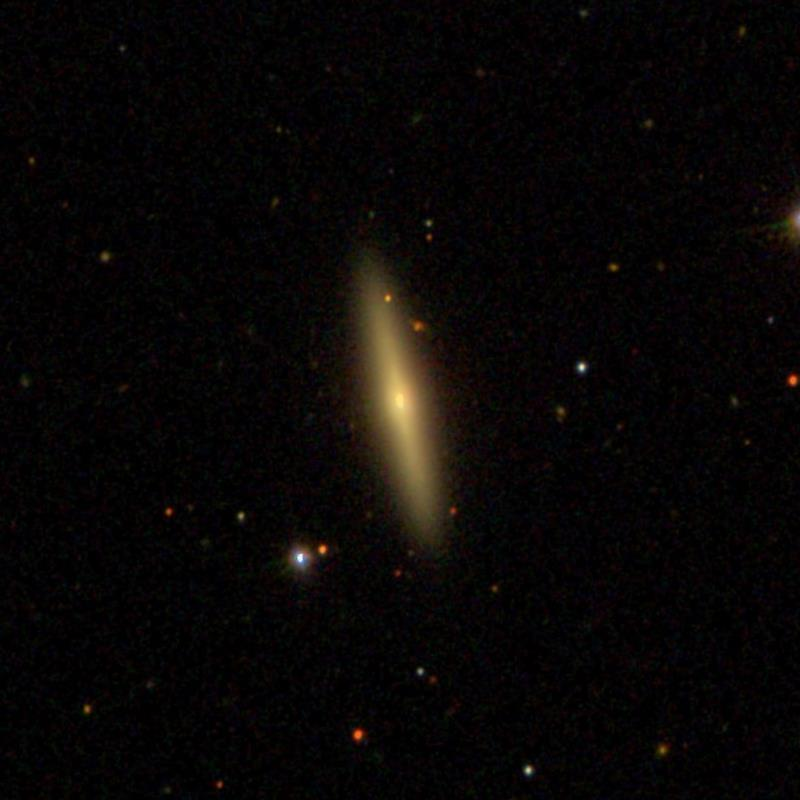
NGC 781 (SDSS DR14)

== See also ==
- List of NGC objects (1–1000)
