= NGC 871 =

Barred spiral galaxy in Aries

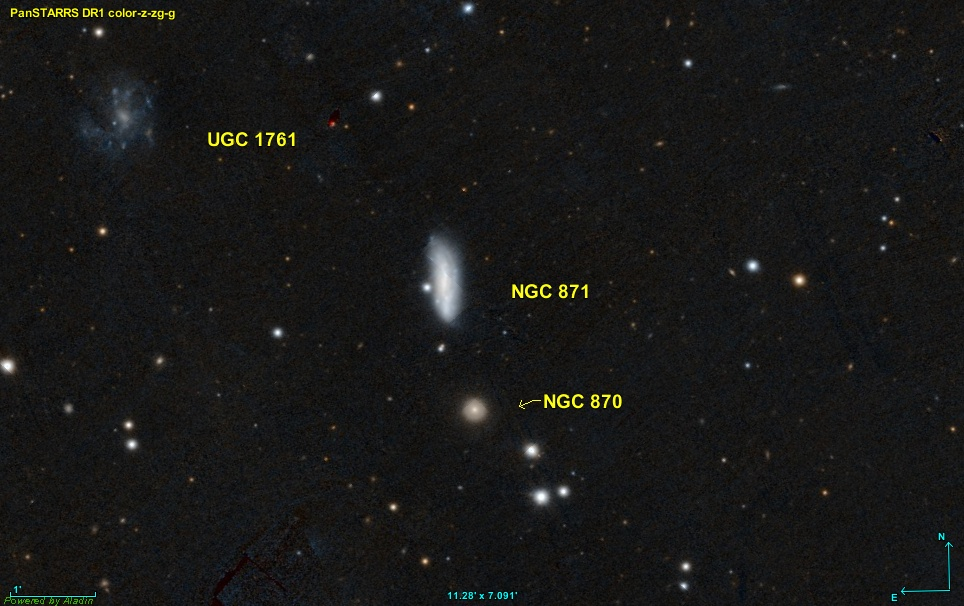

Observation data (J2000 epoch)
- Constellation: Aries
- Right ascension: 02^{h} 17^{m} 10.7^{s}
- Declination: +14° 32′ 53″
- Redshift: +0.012475±0.000003
- Heliocentric radial velocity: 3740 ± 1 km/s
- Distance: 52,2 ± 3,7 (170 ± 12)×10^{6} ly)
- Apparent magnitude (V): 13.4 mag
- Apparent magnitude (B): 14.1 mag

Characteristics
- Type: SB(s)c:

Other designations
- NGC 0871 • UGC 1759 • PGC 8722 • CGCG 438-046 • MCG -02-06-053 • IRAS 02144+1419 • 2MASX J02171073+1432521 • CN 513

NGC 871 is a barred spiral galaxy in the constellation Aries. It was discovered by William Herschel on October 14, 1784 and the findings published in his Catalogue of Nebulae and Clusters of Stars in 1786.

By using the galaxies' radial velocities and distances as a grouping factor, astronomers assign this galaxy to LGG (Lyon Groups of Galaxies) 53 along with 8 other members (UGC 1693, UGC 1761, NGC 876, NGC 877, UGC 1817, IC 1791 and UGC 1773).

== Galaxy group NGC 871/6/7 ==
At the current epoch, most galaxies can be found in medium-density group environments, where tidal interactions play an important role in galactic evolution. Several nearby, gas-rich groups exhibit clear signs of these interactions, giving the opportunity for scientists to study how galaxies are formed and interact with each other.

In 2012 astronomers conducted an extensive survey to measure the Hl emissions from NGC 871 and other galaxies in LGG 53, using the Giant Metrewave Radio Telescope and Canada–France–Hawaii Telescope. This galaxy group first attracted attention due to its gas-rich interaction as well as harboring AGC (Arecibo General Catalog) 749170, a galaxy with a mass of ~×10^{9.3} M_{☉}. This group resides in a common HI distribution with a total HI mass of M_{hl} 6 x 10×10^{10} M_{☉}. Such a massive structure is very rare in the local Universe (galaxies with a M_{hl} > ×10^{10} M_{☉} represents less 2 per cent of cases) and each large spiral in NGC 871/6/7 seems to exceeds this value.

The study suggests seven of the eight gas-rich detections (three spirals and four dwarfs) contain stellar components and appear to be standard dark-matter dominated galaxies that were built during the epoch of galaxy assembly. AGC 749170 however is probably the result of major mergers and very active tidal interaction, resulting in the massive structure we can observe today.

== See also ==
- New General Catalogue
- List of NGC objects
