= NGC 903 =

Lenticular galaxy in the constellation Aries

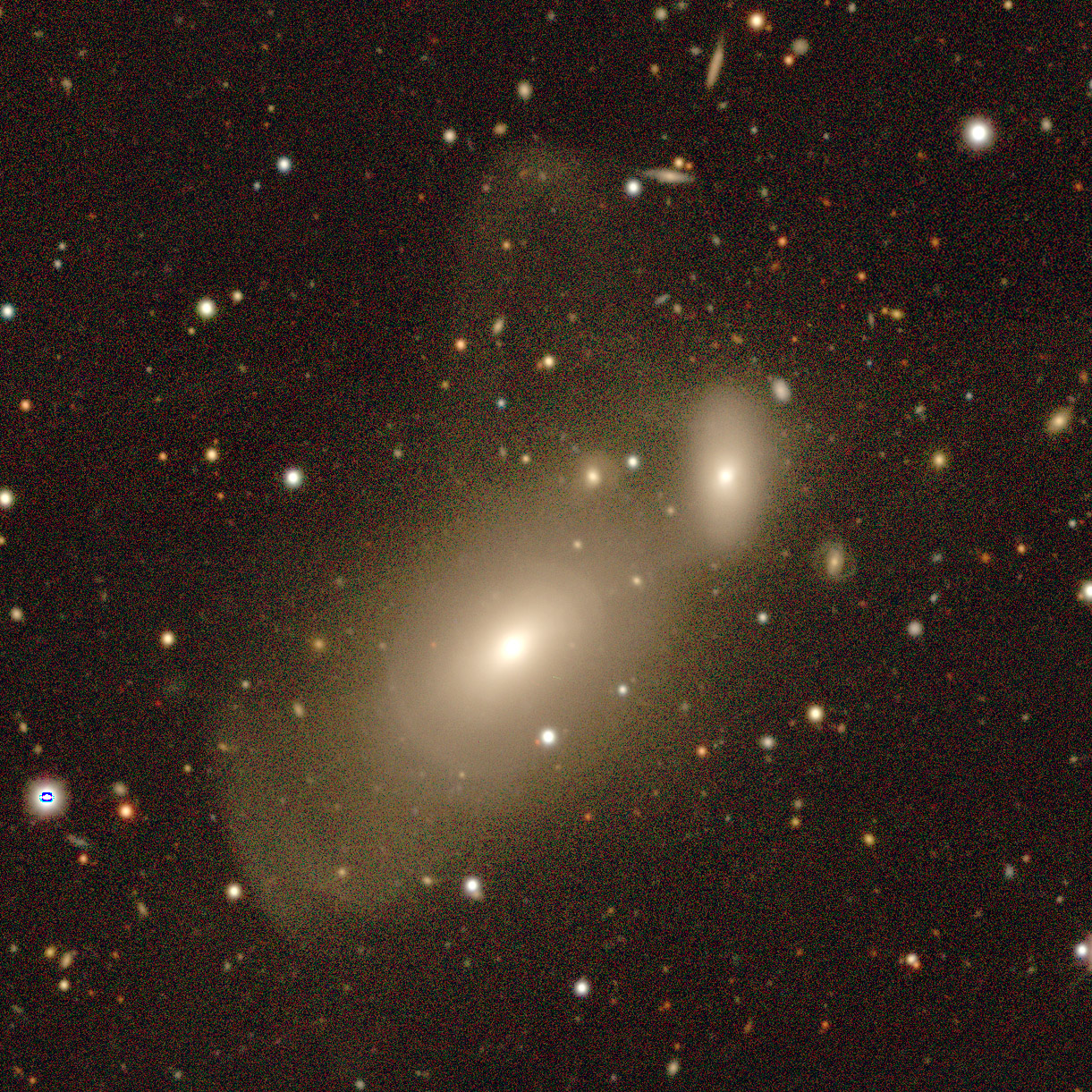
- legacy surveys image of NGC 903 (right) and NGC 904

Observation data (J2000 epoch)
- Constellation: Aries
- Right ascension: 02^{h} 24^{m} 00.89555^{s}
- Declination: +27° 21′ 23.1264″
- Redshift: 0.01682
- Heliocentric radial velocity: 5000 km/s
- Distance: 231.0 ± 16.2 Mly (70.83 ± 4.97 Mpc)
- Apparent magnitude (B): 16.71

Other designations
- PGC 9097

NGC 903 is a lenticular galaxy in the constellation Aries. It is estimated to be about 230 million light-years from the Milky Way and has a diameter of approximately 35,000 ly. NGC 903 was discovered on 13 December 1884 by the astronomer Edouard Stephan.

== See also ==
- List of NGC objects (1–1000)
