= NGC 695 =

Galaxy in the constellation Aries

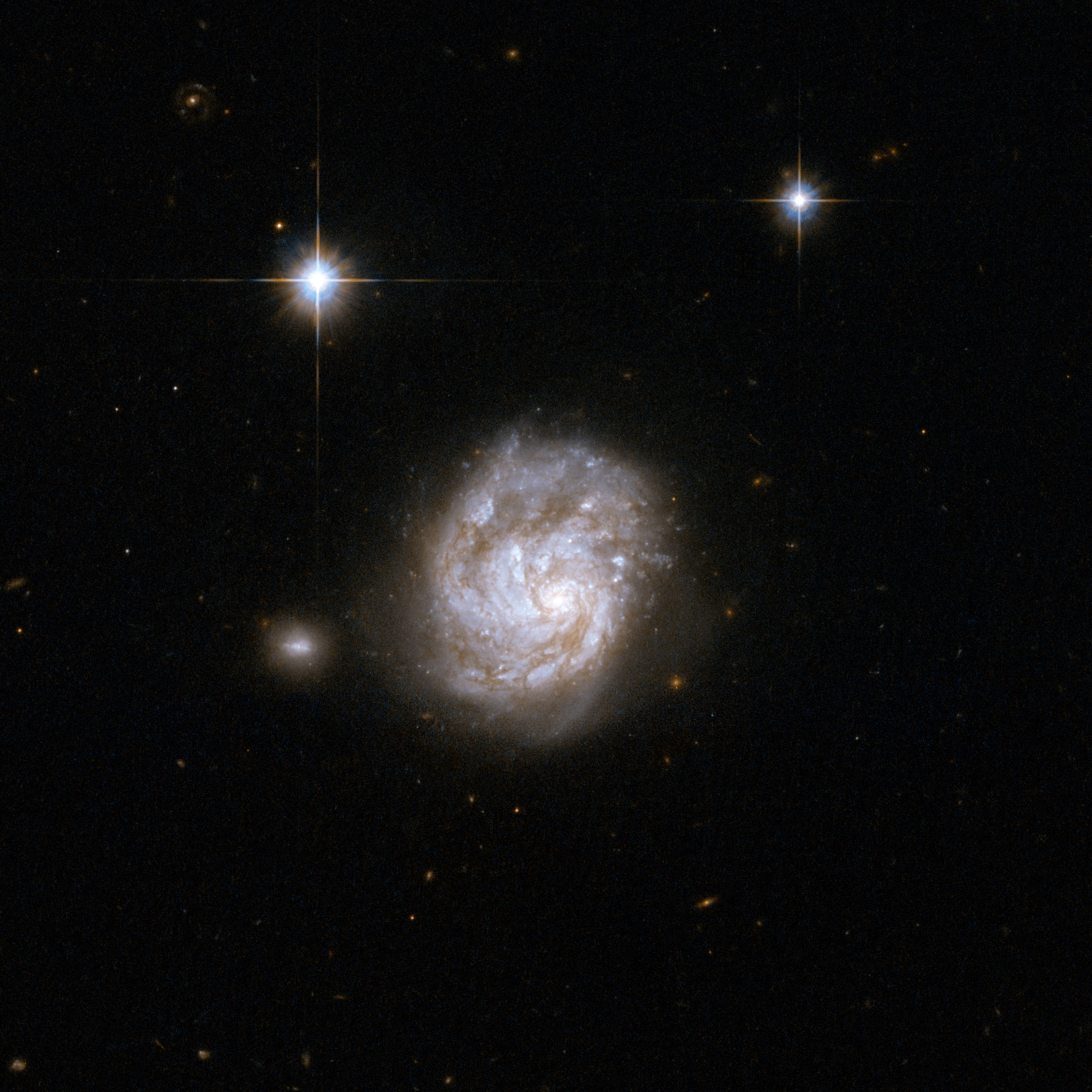
- NGC 695 as taken from the HST

Observation data (J2000 epoch)
- Constellation: Aries
- Right ascension: 1^{h} 51^{m} 14.242^{s}
- Declination: 22° 34′ 56.51″
- Redshift: 0.032472
- Distance: 450 million light years
- Apparent magnitude (V): 12.80

Characteristics
- Type: S0? pec
- Apparent size (V): 30" x 24"
- Notable features: luminous infrared galaxy

Other designations
- UGC 1315, V Zw 123, CGCG 482-026, PGC 006844

NGC 695 is a spiral galaxy located 450 million light years from the Earth, in the constellation of Aries. It has been described as an abnormal galaxy, and has the appearance of "a revolving tornado". Its arms are not tightly held together, and it is interacting with another small astronomical object. Despite its distance of nearly 0.5 billion lightyears, the galaxy's extremely luminous starburst disk, bright IR and UV emissions earned it a spot in the NGC catalogue. VLASS 1.2 survey images indicate the presence of extended radio emission in the core of the galaxy- indicative of either an active SMBH, nuclear starburst, or both.
