= NGC 938 =

Galaxy in the constellation Aries

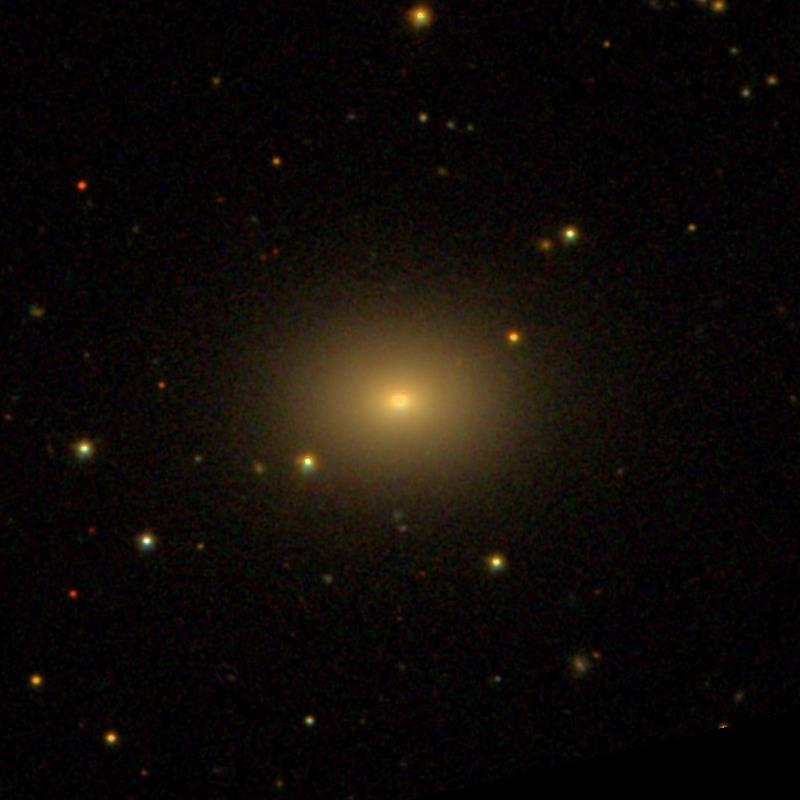
- SDSS image of NGC 938

Observation data (J2000 epoch)
- Constellation: Aries
- Right ascension: 02^{h} 28^{m} 33.51968^{s}
- Declination: +20° 17′ 01.3642″
- Redshift: 0.013653
- Heliocentric radial velocity: 4065 km/s
- Distance: 179.2 Mly (54.94 Mpc)
- Apparent magnitude (B): 13.8

Characteristics
- Type: E3

Other designations
- UGC 1947, MCG +03-07-017, PGC 9423

NGC 938 is an elliptical galaxy located in the constellation Aries, approximately 184 million light years from the Milky Way. It was discovered by the Prussian astronomer Heinrich d'Arrest in 1863.

== Supernova ==
One supernova has been observed in NGC 938: SN 2015ab (Type Ia, mag. 17.3) was discovered by Kōichi Itagaki on 10 July 2015.

== See also ==
- List of NGC objects (1–1000)
