= NGC 665 =

Galaxy in the constellation Pisces

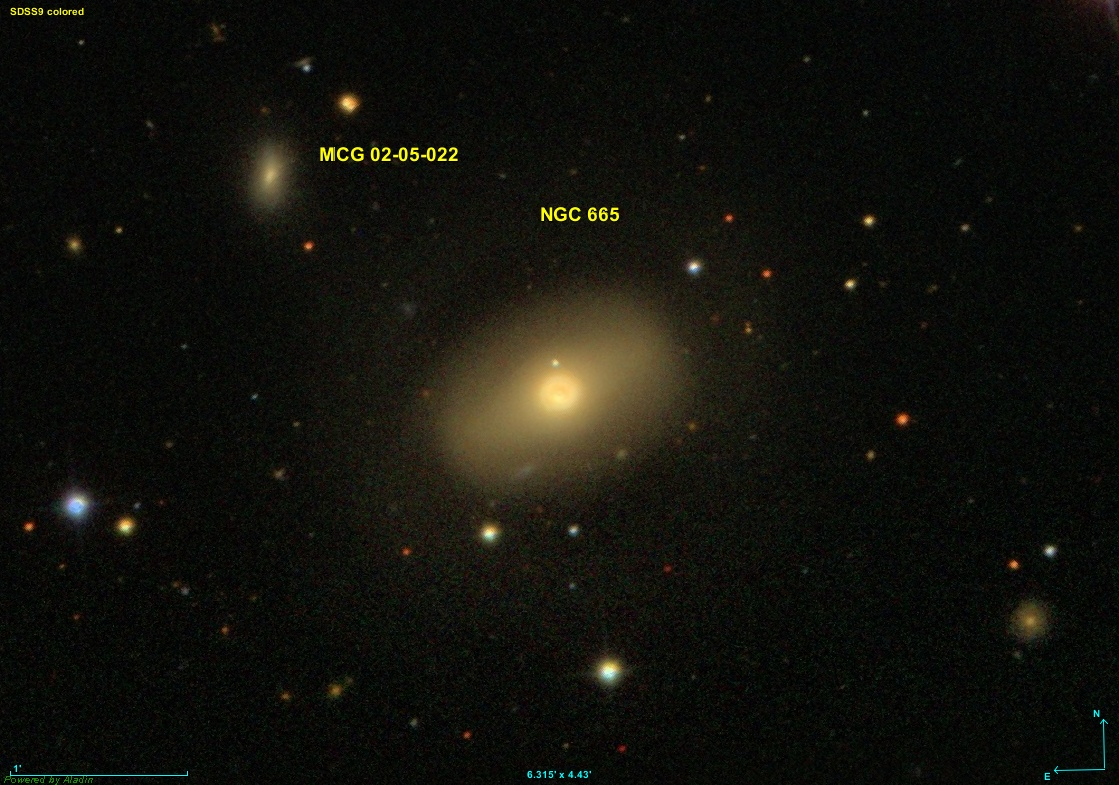
- A SDSS image of NGC 665

Observation data (J2000 epoch)
- Constellation: Pisces
- Right ascension: 01^{h} 44^{m} 56.10^{s}
- Declination: +10° 25′ 23″
- Redshift: 0.018079±0.000103
- Distance: 236 Mly (72.3 Mpc)
- Apparent magnitude (V): 12.2

Characteristics
- Type: (R)S0^0
- Size: 100,000 ly
- Apparent size (V): 1.8 x 1.0
- Notable features: Small halo of gas visible at galactic center

Other designations
- UGC 1223, MCG +02-05-019, PGC 6415

NGC 665 is a lenticular galaxy 236 million light-years away in the constellation Pisces. NGC 665 was discovered in 1786 by William Herschel, and is 100,000 light-years across. In the center of NGC 665, a small halo of dust and gas can be seen, indicating some small star-forming regions. NGC 665 is not known to have an active galactic nuclei, as seen in the SDSS image.

== Nearby and satellite galaxies ==
Like other galaxies, NGC 665 has a satellite galaxy (MCG 02-05-022), a dwarf elliptical galaxy, as seen in the SDSS image of NGC 665. Its nearby cluster of stars is NGC 663.

According to A.M. Garcia, NGC 665 is a member of the NGC 673 Group (also known as LGG 31). This group contains at least 17 galaxies, including IC 156, IC 162, NGC 673, NGC 677, NGC 683, and 11 galaxies from the UGC catalogue.
