= Sigma Arietis =

Star in the constellation Aries

σ Arietis
- Location of σ Arietis (circled)

Observation data Epoch J2000.0 Equinox J2000.0 (ICRS)
- Constellation: Aries
- Right ascension: 02^{h} 51^{m} 29.586^{s}
- Declination: +15° 04′ 55.44″
- Apparent magnitude (V): +5.52

Characteristics
- Evolutionary stage: main sequence
- Spectral type: B7 V
- U−B color index: −0.43
- B−V color index: −0.09

Astrometry
Radial velocity (R_{v})	+17±2 km/s
Proper motion (μ)	RA: +29.636 mas/yr Dec.: −24.650 mas/yr
Parallax (π)	7.0519±0.134 mas
Distance	463 ± 9 ly (142 ± 3 pc)
Absolute magnitude (M_{V})	−0.38

Details

A
Mass	3.84±0.08 M_{☉}
Radius	3 R_{☉}
Luminosity	301 L_{☉}
Surface gravity (log g)	4.0±0.25 cgs
Temperature	13,121 K
Rotational velocity (v sin i)	165 km/s
Age	36+57 −27 Myr

B
Mass	1.0–1.2 M_{☉}
Temperature	5,524±150 K
Metallicity [Fe/H]	−0.5 dex
Rotational velocity (v sin i)	5 km/s

Other designations
- σ Ari, 43 Arietis, BD+14 480, FK5 1079, GC 3427, HD 17769, HIP 13327, HR 847, SAO 93144, PPM 118608

Database references
SIMBAD	data

Sigma Arietis is a star in the northern constellation of Aries. Its name is a Bayer designation that is Latinized from σ Arietis, and abbreviated Sigma Ari or σ Ari. This star has an apparent visual magnitude of +5.52, which is bright enough for the star to be seen with the naked eye from dark suburban skies. The star is located at a distance of approximately 463 light-years (142 parsecs) from the Sun based on parallax measurements, and is drifting further away with a radial velocity of +17 km/s. On November 20, 1952, it was observed being occulted by the planet Jupiter.

Sigma Arietis is a B-type main sequence star with a stellar classification of B7 V. This is a large star with three times the radius of the Sun and 3.8 times the Sun's mass. It shines around 301 times as brightly as the Sun, with this energy being radiated into space from its outer atmosphere at an effective temperature of 13,121 K. It is this heat that gives the star the blue-white hue of a B-type star. Sigma Arietis is spinning at a rapid clip, with a projected rotational velocity of 165 km/s. It is about 36 million years old and is a probable member of the Cas-Tau OB association of stars that share a common motion through space.

In 2016, a stellar companion was reported based on observations using adaptive optics with the Gemini North Telescope. This object has a mass equal to or slightly greater than the Sun. It has an effective temperature of 5,524 K.
