= 7 Arietis =

Binary star system in the constellation Aries

Observation data Epoch J2000 Equinox ICRS
- Constellation: Aries
- Right ascension: 01^{h} 55^{m} 51.03905^{s}
- Declination: +23° 34′ 38.3509″
- Apparent magnitude (V): 5.76

Characteristics
- Spectral type: K1 III
- U−B color index: +1.04
- B−V color index: +1.185
- Variable type: Eclipsing binary (disputed)

Astrometry
Radial velocity (R_{v})	+15.95 km/s
Proper motion (μ)	RA: +11.050 mas/yr Dec.: −9.513 mas/yr
Parallax (π)	5.3941±0.1720 mas
Distance	600 ± 20 ly (185 ± 6 pc)

Details
Radius	25.0+0.9 −1.4 R_{☉}
Luminosity	231.3±8.5 L_{☉}
Temperature	4500+130 −78 K
Rotational velocity (v sin i)	1.8±1.0 km/s

Other designations
- 7 Ari, RR Arietis, BD+22 284, FK5 2130, HD 11763, HIP 8993, HR 559, SAO 75030

Database references
SIMBAD	data

7 Arietis is a binary star system in the northern constellation of Aries. 7 Arietis is the Flamsteed designation. The pair have a combined apparent visual magnitude of 5.76, making it faintly visible to the naked eye from dark suburban skies. Based upon an annual parallax shift of 5.39 mas, it is approximately 600 light-years (180 parsecs) distant from the Earth, give or take a 30 light-year margin of error. It is drifting further away from the Sun with a radial velocity of +16 km/s.

This is listed as an eclipsing binary system with a period of 47.9 days (although the star does not appear to be variable in the General Catalogue of Photometric Data, the Hipparcos data, and a study done in 1979-1980) It has the variable star designation RR Arietis. During each eclipse of the primary star, the magnitude of the system decreases by 0.40. The eclipse of the secondary reduces the magnitude by 0.35. The primary component of the system is an evolved giant star with a stellar classification of K1 III. It is about 25 times the size of the Sun and is radiating 231 times the Sun's luminosity from its photosphere at an eeffective temperature of 4,500 K.

The eclipsing binary nature of this star has been disputed by Italian astronomer Ennio Poretti. Observations made as part of the British Astronomical Association eclipsing binaries program by Tristram Brelstaff were also unable to confirm eclipses.
