= NGC 877 =

Galaxy located in the constellation Aries

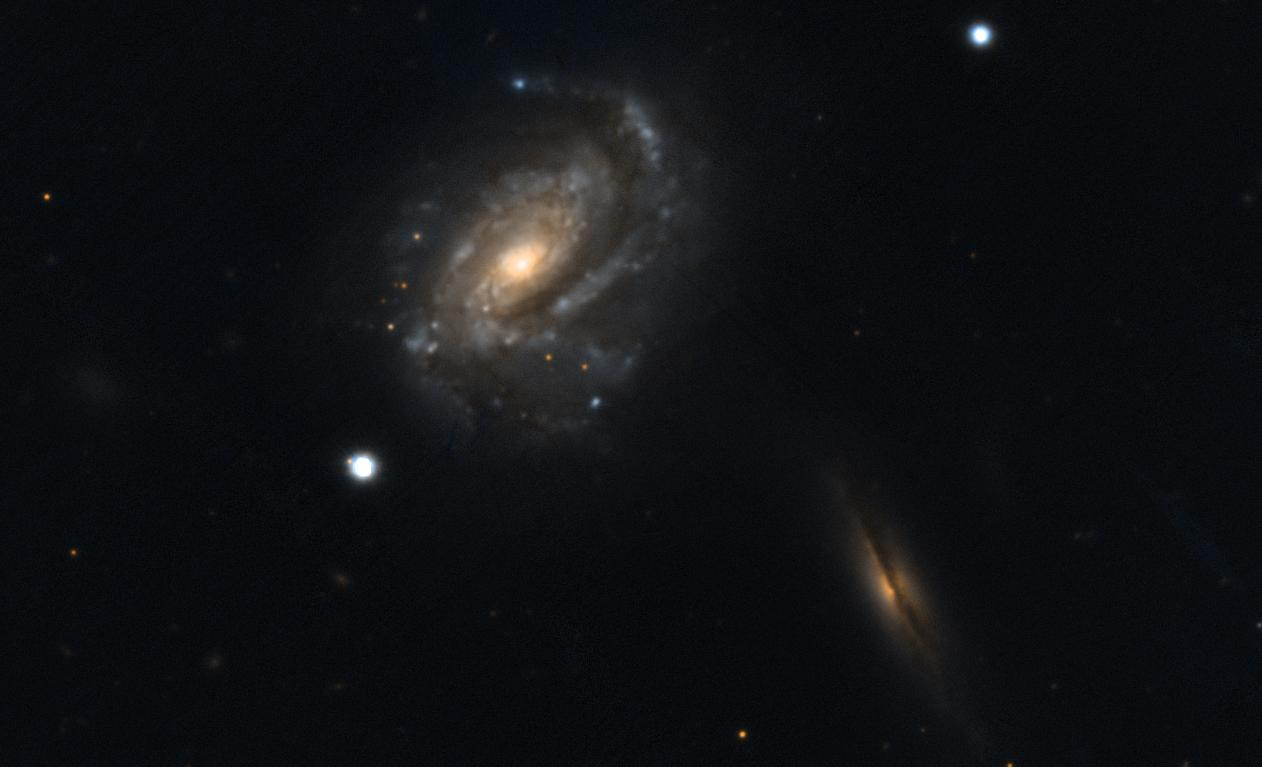
- NGC 877 (left) and NGC 876 (right) by PanSTARRS

Observation data (J2000 epoch)
- Constellation: Aries
- Right ascension: 02^{h} 17^{m} 59.6^{s}
- Declination: +14° 32′ 38″
- Redshift: 0.013052 ± 0.000010
- Heliocentric radial velocity: 3,913 ± 3 km/s
- Distance: 154 ± 25 Mly (47.1 ± 7.5 Mpc)
- Apparent magnitude (V): 11.8

Characteristics
- Type: SAB(rs)bc
- Apparent size (V): 2.4′ × 1.8′
- Notable features: Luminous infrared galaxy

Other designations
- UGC 1768, CGCG 438-052, MCG +02-06-058, PGC 8775

NGC 877 is an intermediate spiral galaxy located in the constellation Aries. It is located at a distance of circa 160 million light years from Earth, which, given its apparent dimensions, means that NGC 877 is about 115,000 light years across. It was discovered by William Herschel on October 14, 1784. It interacts with NGC 876.

NGC 877 features two spiral arms with a grand design pattern and slightly disturbed morphology. When pictured in H-alpha, the arms have numerous knots and appear brighter than the nucleus. The northwest part of the galaxy has higher polarised emission than the rest of the galaxy. A bar appears in radio waves. The nucleus has activity that resembles that of a HII region. The galaxy has been categorised as a luminous infrared galaxy, a category of galaxies associated with high star formation rate. The total infrared luminosity of the galaxy is estimated to be between 10^{11.04} L_{☉} and 10^{11.1} L_{☉}, lying near the threshold to classify a galaxy as luminous infrared. The total star formation rate in NGC 877 is estimated to be between 20 and 53 M_{☉} per year.

NGC 877 forms a pair with the edge-on spiral galaxy NGC 876, which lies 2.1 arcminutes to the southwest. At the distance of NGC 877, this corresponds to a projected distance of 30 kpc. A low surface brightness bridge connects the two galaxies. NGC 870 and NGC 871 are two other nearby galaxies. NGC 877 is the brightest and most massive member of a galaxy group known as the NGC 877 group or LGG (Lyon Groups of Galaxies) 53. Other members of the group include NGC 876 and NGC 871, as well as UGC 1693, IC 1791, UGC 1773, and UGC 1817. The group contains large amounts of HI gas.

During the October 2050 lunar eclipse, a Total Lunar Eclipse, it will be occulted by the Moon over the southeast Pacific Ocean, South America and the Atlantic Ocean. This will happen again during the October 2069 lunar eclipse over the northern half of Asia and the Northwest Pacific.

== Supernova ==
One supernova has been observed in NGC 877.

- SN 2019rn (Type IIb, mag. 18.86) was discovered by the robotic sky survey ATLAS on January 12.30, 2019, using a twin 0.5m telescope system. The supernova was initially classified as a Type II supernova with spectroscopic observations by Keck-II, but further spectrographic observations categorized it as Type IIb.

== Gallery ==
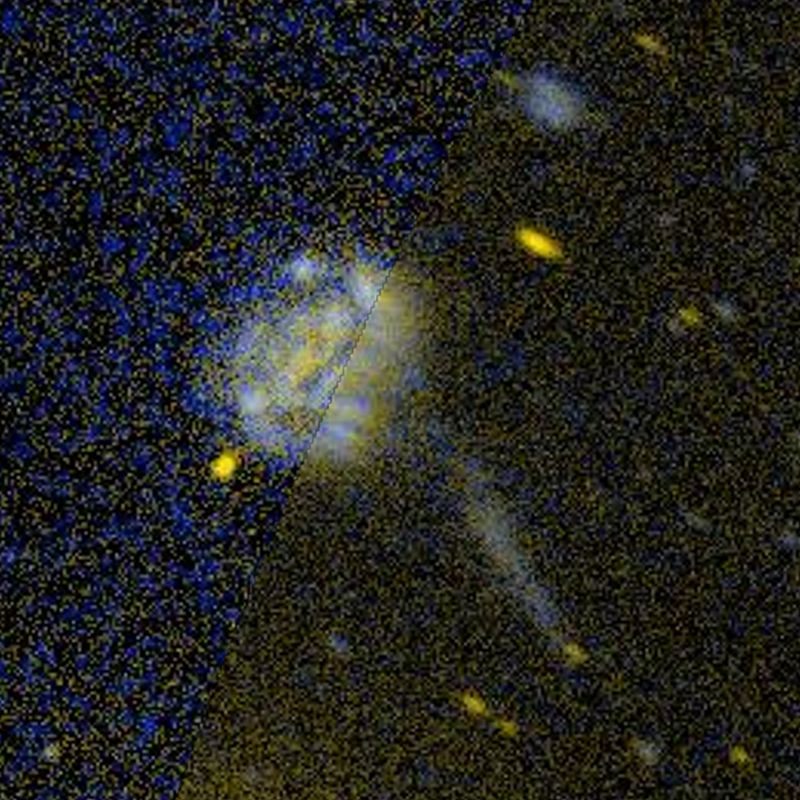
NGC 877 (left) and NGC 876 by GALEX

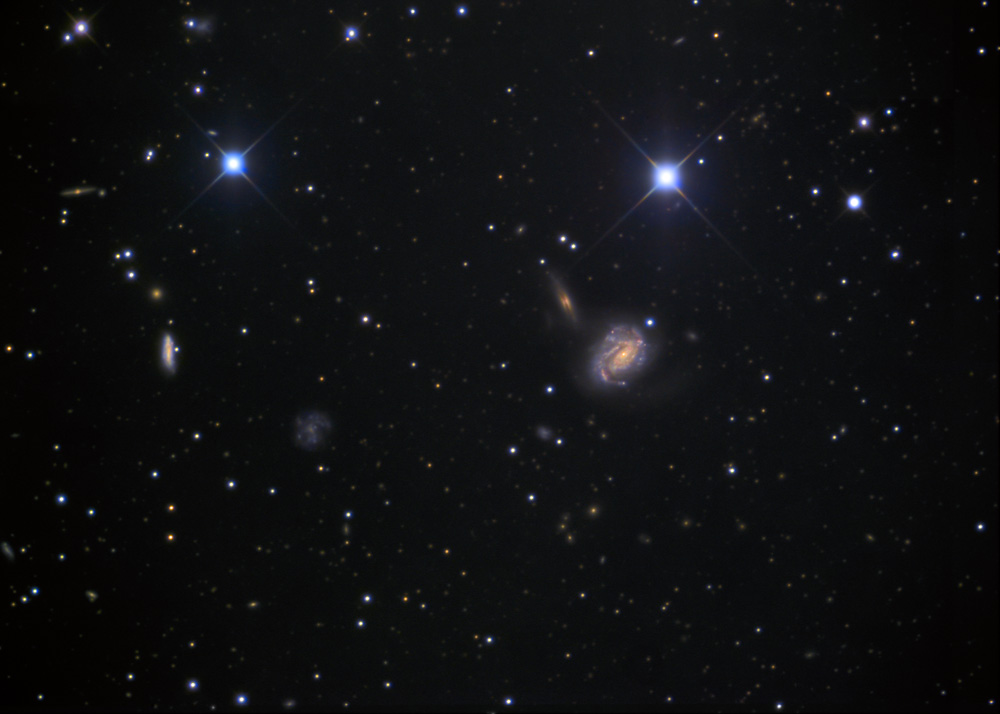
View of the NGC 877 group, by Adam Block
