= Lambda Arietis =

Double star system in the constellation Aries

λ Arietis
- Location of λ Arietis (circled)

Observation data Epoch J2000 Equinox J2000
- Constellation: Aries
- Right ascension: 01^{h} 57^{m} 55.717^{s}
- Declination: +23° 35′ 45.83″
- Apparent magnitude (V): 4.79 (4.95/7.75)

Characteristics
- Spectral type: F0 V + G1 V
- U−B color index: +0.09
- B−V color index: +0.290
- R−I color index: +0.16

Astrometry

λ Ari A
| Radial velocity (R_{v}) | −1.4 km/s |
| Proper motion (μ) | RA: −92.295 mas/yr Dec.: −13.207 mas/yr |
| Parallax (π) | 24.7748±0.2189 mas |
| Distance | 132 ± 1 ly (40.4 ± 0.4 pc) |
| Absolute magnitude (M_{V}) | 1.81 |

λ Ari B
| Radial velocity (R_{v}) | −8 km/s |
| Proper motion (μ) | RA: −91.839 mas/yr Dec.: −19.370 mas/yr |
| Parallax (π) | 24.8689±0.0446 mas |
| Distance | 131.2 ± 0.2 ly (40.21 ± 0.07 pc) |

Details

λ Ari A
| Mass | 1.65±0.27 M_{☉} |
| Radius | 2.45±0.09 R_{☉} |
| Luminosity | 15.43±0.66 L_{☉} |
| Surface gravity (log g) | 3.88±0.08 cgs |
| Temperature | 7,311±125 K |
| Metallicity [Fe/H] | +0.01 dex |
| Rotational velocity (v sin i) | 107 km/s |
| Age | 618 Myr |

λ Ari B
| Mass | 1.13±0.15 M_{☉} |
| Radius | 1.14±0.06 R_{☉} |
| Luminosity | 1.60±0.05 L_{☉} |
| Surface gravity (log g) | 4.37±0.08 cgs |
| Temperature | 6,072±130 K |
| Metallicity [Fe/H] | −0.03 dex |

Other designations
- 9 Arietis, HD 11973, HIP 9153, HR 569, SAO 75051, ADS 1563, CCDM 01580+2336, WDS J01579+2336
- λ Ari A: BD+22 288, GC 2366, TIC 60986648
- λ Ari B: BD+22 289, GC 2367, PPM 91238, TIC 60986644

Database references
| SIMBAD | data |

Lambda Arietis is a double star in the northern constellation of Aries. Its name is a Bayer designation that is Latinized from λ Arietis, and abbreviated Lambda Ari or λ Ari. Based upon an annual parallax shift of 25.32 arcseconds, this system is approximately 129 light-years (40 parsecs) distant from Earth. The pair have a combined apparent visual magnitude of 4.79, which is bright enough to be viewed with the naked eye. Because the yellow secondary is nearly three magnitudes fainter than the white primary, they are a challenge to split with quality 7× binoculars but are readily resolvable at 10×.

The brighter component is an F-type main sequence star with a visual magnitude of 4.95 and a stellar classification of F0 V. It is an estimated 618 million years old with a high rate of rotation, showing a projected rotational velocity of 107 km/s. This star has 1.7 times the mass of the Sun and 2.5 times the Sun's radius. It is radiating 15 times the luminosity of the Sun from its photosphere at an effective temperature of 7,311 K.

At an angular separation of 37.4 arcseconds is fainter, magnitude 7.75 companion. This is a G-type main sequence star with a classification of G1 V. The star is at a similar distance as the brighter component, and has a comparable proper motion. In 1988, Helmut Abt listed this as a physical pair, showing a common proper motion with a projected separation of 1,600 au.
