= NGC 691 =

Galaxy in the constellation Aries

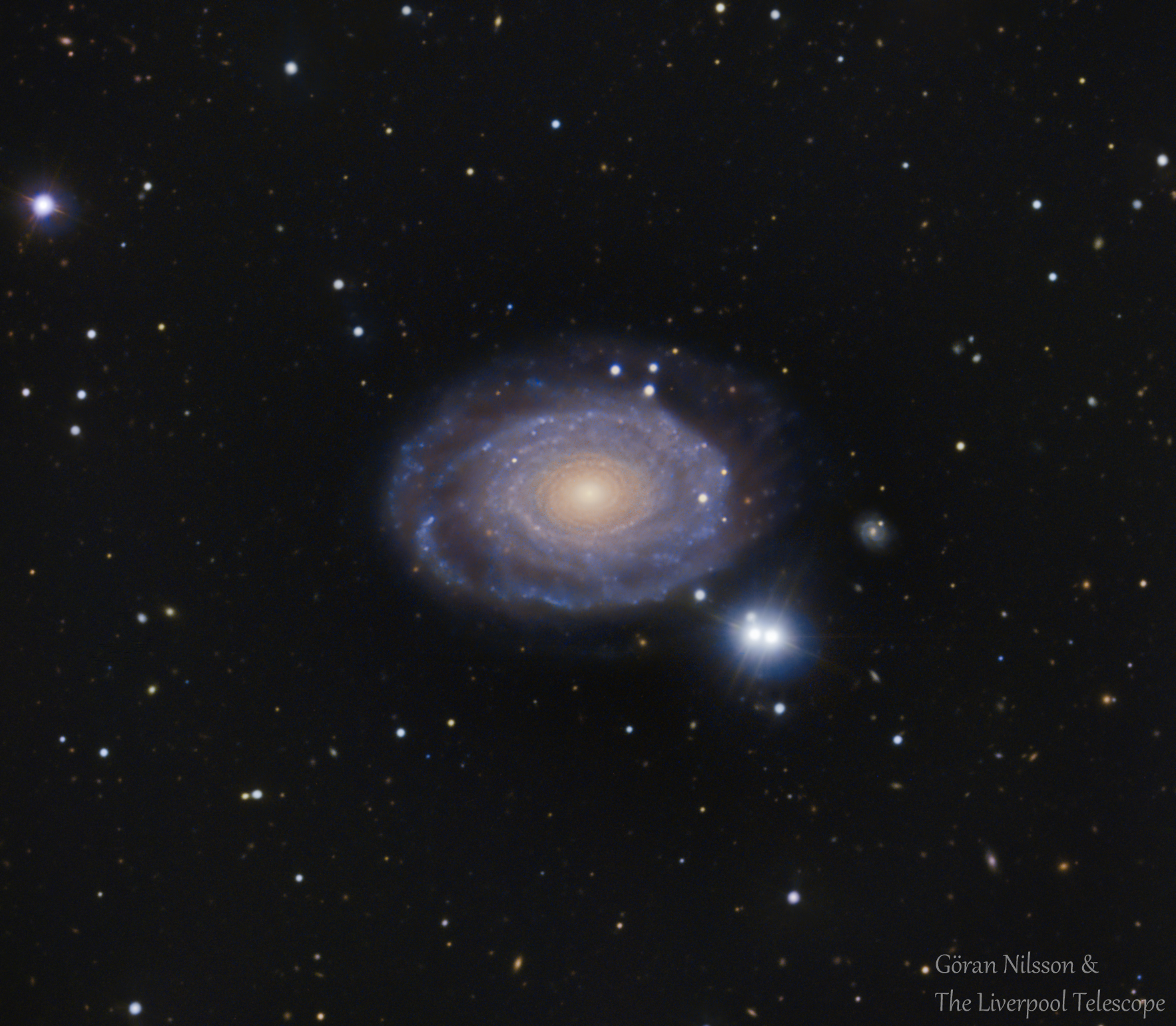
- NGC 691 by the Liverpool Telescope

Observation data (J2000 epoch)
- Constellation: Aries
- Right ascension: 01^{h} 50^{m} 41.7^{s}
- Declination: +21° 45′ 36″
- Redshift: 0.008889 ± 0.000013
- Heliocentric radial velocity: 2,665 ± 5 km/s
- Distance: 119 ± 14 Mly (36.5 ± 4.3 Mpc)
- Apparent magnitude (V): 11.5

Characteristics
- Type: SA(rs)bc
- Apparent size (V): 3.5′ × 2.6′

Other designations
- UGC 1305, CGCG 482-023, MCG +04-05-019, PGC 6793

NGC 691 is an unbarred spiral galaxy located in the constellation Aries. It is located at a distance of circa 120 million light years from Earth, which, given its apparent dimensions, means that NGC 691 is about 130,000 light years across. It was discovered by William Herschel on November 13, 1786.

NGC 691 features a multiple ring structure, with three rings recognised in the infrared, with diameters of 1.03, 1.67, and 2.79 arcminutes. When imaged in H-alpha, the galaxy appears patchy. The total star formation rate of the galaxy is estimated to be about 0.6 M_{☉} per year.

== NGC 691 Group ==
NGC 691 is the foremost member of a galaxy group known as the NGC 691 group. Other members of the group include IC 163, NGC 678, NGC 680, NGC 694, IC 167, and NGC 697.

== Supernova ==
One supernova has been observed in NGC 691. SN 2005W was discovered by Yoji Hirose in unfiltered CCD frames taken on Feb. 1.442 UT with a 0.35-m f/6.8 Schmidt-Cassegrain reflector. The supernova was located 56" east and 1" south of the center of NGC 691 and at the time of the discovery had an apparent magnitude of 15.2. Spectrographic observations indicated it was a Type Ia supernova about a week before maximum. The peak magnitude of the supernova was 14.3, on February 10.759.

== Gallery ==
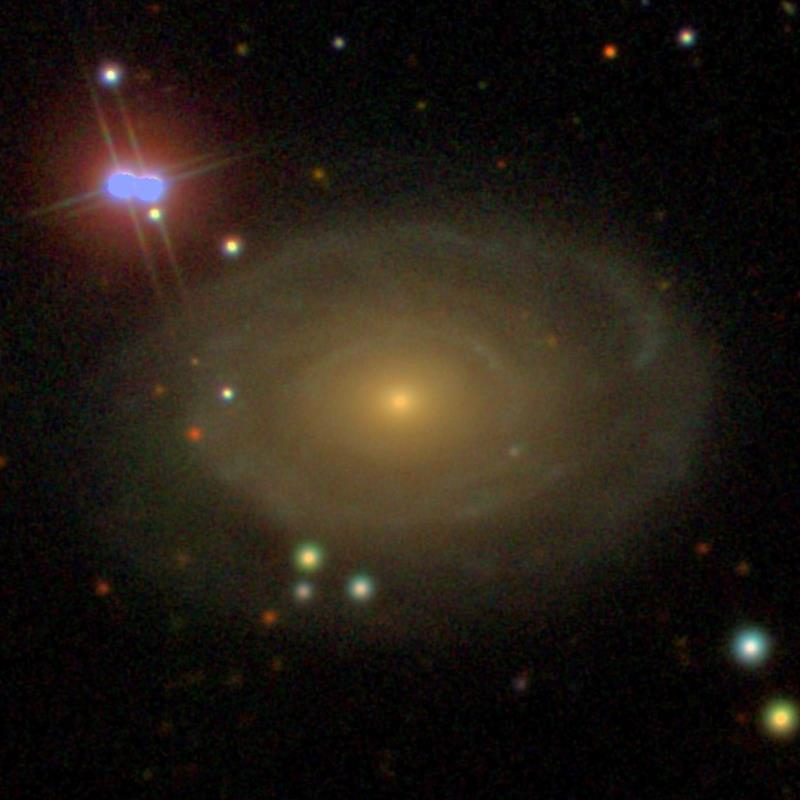
NGC 691 imaged by SDSS

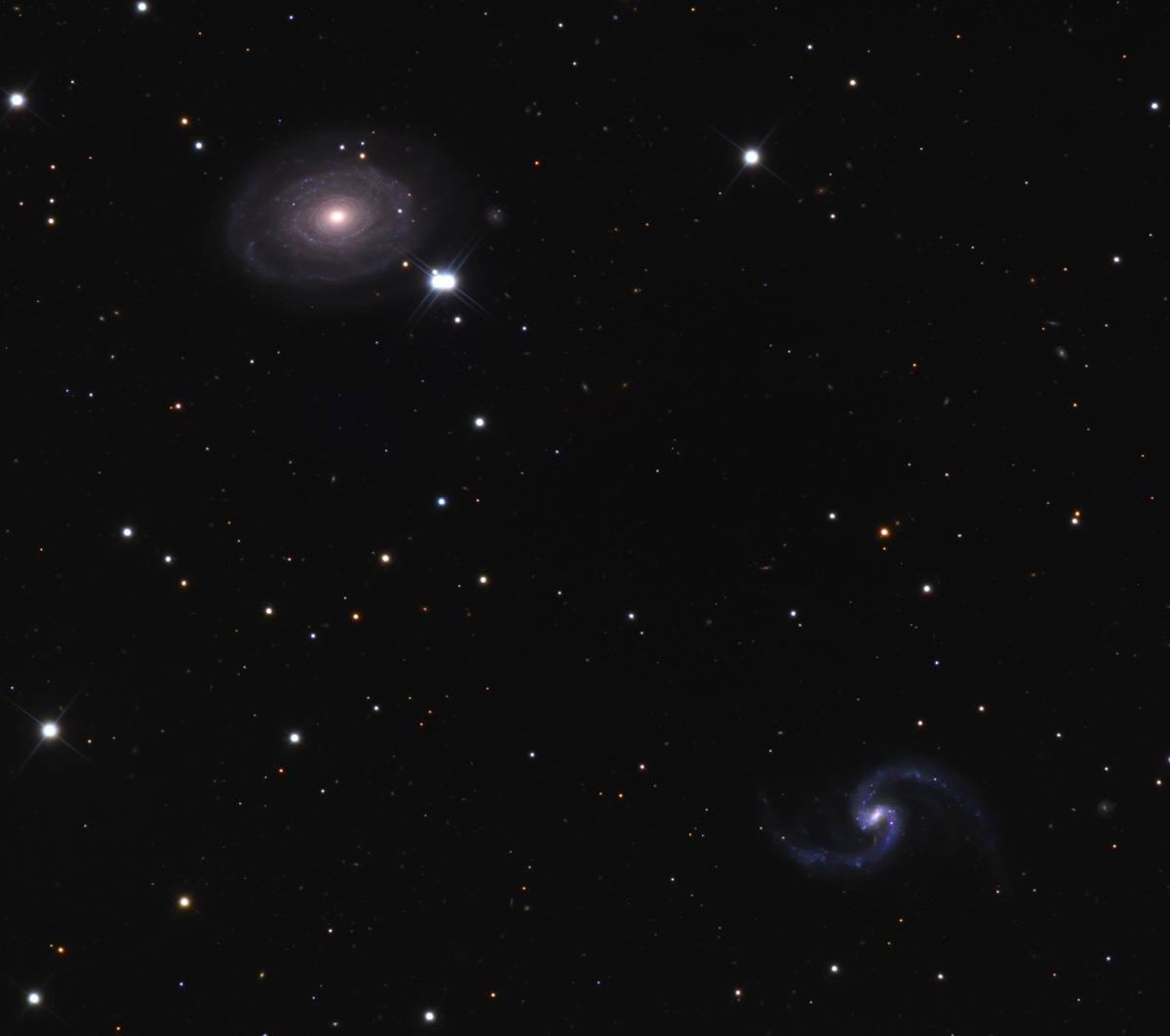
NGC 691 (top) and IC 167 (bottom) imaged by the Mount Lemmon SkyCenter

NGC 691 imaged by the Hubble Space Telescope
