= Nu Arietis =

Star in the constellation Aries

ν Arietis
Observation data Epoch J2000.0 Equinox J2000.0 (ICRS)
- Constellation: Aries
- Right ascension: 02^{h} 38^{m} 48.992^{s}
- Declination: +21° 57′ 41.05″
- Apparent magnitude (V): 5.43

Characteristics
- Evolutionary stage: main sequence
- Spectral type: A7 V
- U−B color index: +0.13
- B−V color index: +0.168±0.004

Astrometry
Radial velocity (R_{v})	+8.0±4.2 km/s
Proper motion (μ)	RA: −4.203 mas/yr Dec.: −15.103 mas/yr
Parallax (π)	12.0933±0.3264 mas
Distance	270 ± 7 ly (83 ± 2 pc)
Absolute magnitude (M_{V})	+0.40

Details

ν Ari A
Mass	1.89±0.29 M_{☉}
Radius	3.28±0.13 R_{☉}
Luminosity	37.6±2.3 L_{☉}
Surface gravity (log g)	3.68±0.08 cgs
Temperature	7,889±123 K
Rotational velocity (v sin i)	133 km/s
Age	621+269 −268 Myr

ν Ari B
Mass	1.0±0.03 M_{☉}
Temperature	5,551±107 K
Metallicity [Fe/H]	0.0 dex
Rotational velocity (v sin i)	10 km/s

Other designations
- ν Ari, 32 Arietis, BD+21°362, FK5 89, GC 3167, HD 16432, HIP 12332, HR 773, SAO 75495, PPM 91860

Database references
SIMBAD	data

Nu Arietis is a white-hued star in the northern constellation of Aries. Its name is a Bayer designation that is Latinized from ν Arietis, and abbreviated Nu Ari or ν Ari. This star is faintly visible to the naked eye with an apparent visual magnitude of +5.43. Based upon an annual parallax shift of 9.68 mas as seen from Earth, it is located approximately 270 light years from the Sun. It is moving further away with a radial velocity of 8 km/s.

This is an A-type main sequence star with a stellar classification of A7 V. Nu Arietis has an estimated 1.9 times the mass of the Sun and about 3.3 times the Sun's radius. The star is radiating 37.6 times the Sun's luminosity from its photosphere at an effective temperature of around 7,889 K. It is roughly 621 million years old and is spinning with a projected rotational velocity of 133 km/s.

A close companion was discovered in 2016 using the direct spectral detection method. This object has the same mass as the Sun and an effective temperature of 5,551 K.
