= Omicron Arietis =

Star in the constellation Aries

Observation data Epoch J2000.0 Equinox J2000.0 (ICRS)
- Constellation: Aries
- Right ascension: 02^{h} 44^{m} 32.972^{s}
- Declination: +15° 18′ 42.70″
- Apparent magnitude (V): +5.78

Characteristics
- Evolutionary stage: main sequence
- Spectral type: B9 Vn
- U−B color index: −0.21
- B−V color index: −0.01

Astrometry
Radial velocity (R_{v})	−2.4±3.3 km/s
Proper motion (μ)	RA: +2.942 mas/yr Dec.: −16.236 mas/yr
Parallax (π)	5.7867±0.1606 mas
Distance	560 ± 20 ly (173 ± 5 pc)
Absolute magnitude (M_{V})	−0.51

Details
Mass	2.78±0.37 M_{☉}
Radius	4.27±0.14 R_{☉}
Luminosity	217±14 L_{☉}
Surface gravity (log g)	3.62±0.07 cgs
Temperature	10,715±186 K
Rotational velocity (v sin i)	225 km/s
Age	286 Myr

Other designations
- ο Ari, 37 Arietis, BD+14°457, GC 3303, HD 17036, HIP 12803, HR 809, SAO 93082, PPM 118501, TIC 52174783

Database references
SIMBAD	data

Omicron Arietis is a single, blue-white-hued star in the northern constellation of Aries. Its name is a Bayer designation that is Latinised from ο Arietis, and abbreviated Omicron Ari or ο Ari. This star has an apparent visual magnitude of +5.78, which means it is dimly visible to the naked eye. Based upon an annual parallax shift of 5.79 mas as seen from Earth, it is located approximately 560 light-years from the Sun. At that distance, the visual magnitude of the star is diminished by an extinction factor of 0.22 due to interstellar dust.

This is a B-type main-sequence star with a stellar classification of B9 Vn. The 'n' suffix indicates that it has nebulous absorption lines in its spectrum, which are caused by the Doppler effect and rapid rotation. Indeed, it has a projected rotational velocity of 225 km/s. The star has an estimated 2.8 times the mass of the Sun and about 4.3 times the Sun's radius. It is radiating energy from its photosphere at 217 times the Sun's luminosity with an effective temperature of 10,715 K.
