= 14 Arietis =

Star in the constellation Aries

Observation data Epoch J2000 Equinox ICRS
- Constellation: Aries
- Right ascension: 02^{h} 09^{m} 25.3363^{s}
- Declination: +25° 56′ 23.612″
- Apparent magnitude (V): 4.98

Characteristics
- Spectral type: F2 III
- U−B color index: +0.15
- B−V color index: +0.33

Astrometry
Radial velocity (R_{v})	−1.21 km/s
Proper motion (μ)	RA: +70.46 mas/yr Dec.: −34.99 mas/yr
Parallax (π)	11.30±1.07 mas
Distance	290 ± 30 ly (88 ± 8 pc)
Absolute magnitude (M_{V})	0.26

Details
Radius	4 R_{☉}
Luminosity	32 L_{☉}
Surface gravity (log g)	3.2 cgs
Temperature	6,761 K
Rotational velocity (v sin i)	139.6 km/s

Other designations
- BD+25°355, FK5 1089,HD 13174, HIP 10053, HR 623, SAO 75171.

Database references
SIMBAD	data

14 Arietis (abbreviated 14 Ari) is a star in the constellation of Aries. 14 Arietis is the Flamsteed designation. It has an apparent visual magnitude of 4.98, which means it is visible to the naked eye. Based upon a measured annual parallax shift of 11.30 mas, is it located at a distance of approximately 290 light-years (89 parsecs), give or take a 30 light-year margin of error.

This is an astrometric binary system. The primary has a stellar classification of F2 III, suggesting that it is a giant star. Despite being an evolved star with four times the radius of the Sun, it is spinning rapidly with a projected rotational velocity of 139.6 km/s. This is causing a pronounced equatorial bulge, with the radius of the star along the equator being 24% greater than the radius at the poles. The star shines at 32 times the luminosity of the Sun, with this energy being radiated from its outer atmosphere at an effective temperature of 6,761 K. This heat gives it the yellow-white hued glow of an F-type star.
