= NGC 673 =

Galaxy in the constellation Aries

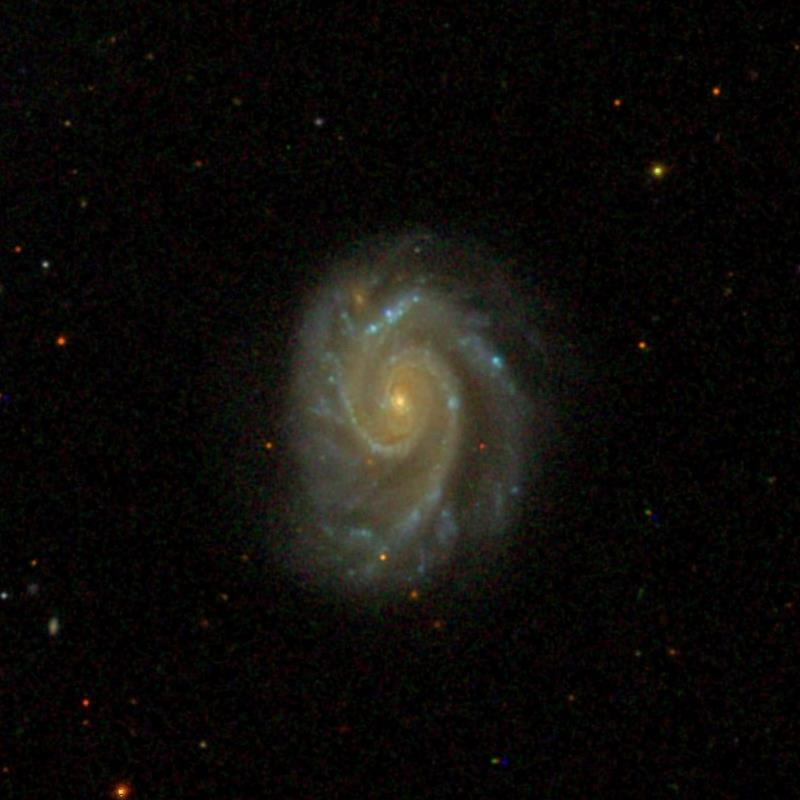
- NGC 673 imaged by SDSS

Observation data (J2000 epoch)
- Constellation: Aries
- Right ascension: 01^{h} 48^{m} 22.4795^{s}
- Declination: +11° 31′ 17.323″
- Redshift: 0.017289
- Heliocentric radial velocity: 5183 ± 1 km/s
- Distance: 235.4 ± 16.5 Mly (72.18 ± 5.06 Mpc)
- Group or cluster: NGC 673 Group (LGG 31)
- Apparent magnitude (V): 12.6

Characteristics
- Type: SAB(s)c
- Size: ~137,900 ly (42.27 kpc) (estimated)
- Apparent size (V): 2.1′ × 1.7′

Other designations
- IRAS 01457+1116, 2MASX J01482246+1131176, UGC 1259, MCG +02-05-033, PGC 6624, CGCG 437-030

NGC 673 is an intermediate spiral galaxy in the constellation of Aries. Its velocity with respect to the cosmic microwave background is 4894 ± 20 km/s, which corresponds to a Hubble distance of 235.4 ± 16.5 Mly (72.18 ± 5.06 Mpc). In addition, 31 non redshift measurements give a closer distance of 206.09 ± 5.54 Mly (63.187 ± 1.699 Mpc). The galaxy was discovered by German-British astronomer William Herschel on 4 September 1786.

According to A.M. Garcia, NGC 673 is the namesake of the NGC 673 Group (also known as LGG 31). This group contains at least 17 galaxies, including IC 156, IC 162, NGC 665, NGC 677, NGC 683, and 11 galaxies from the UGC catalogue.

== Supernovae ==
Two supernovae have been observed in NGC 673:

- British amateur astronomer Mark Armstrong, K. Okazaki, Kahoku-machi, and Yamagata-ken discovered SN 1996bo (Type Ia, mag. 16.5) on 18 October 1996.
- LOTOSS (Lick Observatory and Tenagra Observatory Supernova Searches) discovered SN 2001fa (Type IIn, mag. 16.9) on 18 October 2001.

== See also ==
- List of NGC objects (1–1000)
