= NGC 680 =

Galaxy in the constellation Aries

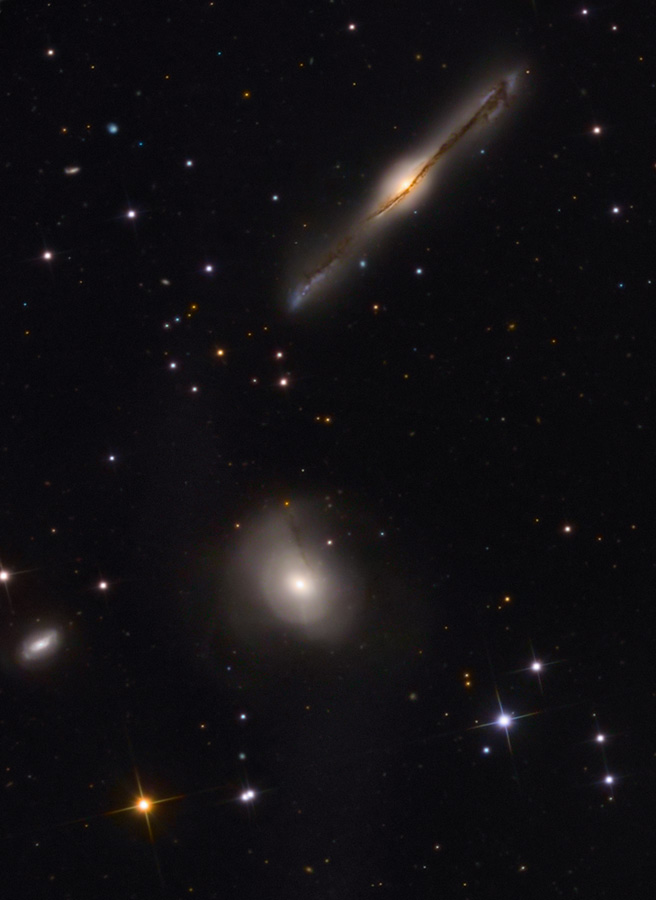
- NGC 680 (center) and NGC 678 (upper right) by the 32-inch Schulman Telescope at Mount Lemmon Observatory

Observation data (J2000 epoch)
- Constellation: Aries
- Right ascension: 01^{h} 49^{m} 47.3^{s}
- Declination: +21° 58′ 15″
- Redshift: 0.009767 ± 0.000017
- Heliocentric radial velocity: 2,928 ± 5 km/s
- Distance: 123 ± 24 Mly (37.9 ± 7.5 Mpc)
- Apparent magnitude (V): 11.9

Characteristics
- Type: E+ pec
- Apparent size (V): 1′.9 × 1′.6

Other designations
- UGC 1286, CGCG 482–019, MCG +04-05-015, PGC 6719

NGC 680 is an elliptical galaxy located in the constellation Aries. It is located at a distance of circa 120 million light years from Earth, which, given its apparent dimensions, means that NGC 680 is about 100,000 light years across. It was discovered by William Herschel on September 15, 1784.

== Characteristics ==
NGC 680 appears asymmetrical, probably due to interactions with other galaxies. The tidal forces have disturbed the shape of the galaxy and have created arcs, shells and an asymmetric envelope. It also features a patchy dusty feature. The hydrogen gas of the galaxy forms two large diffuse stellar plumes that may be associated with tidal tails. One plume extends to the south-east and the other to the north-west and have projected lengths of 75 and 60 kpc accordingly. However, the galaxy does not have a kinematically decoupled nucleus.

All these characteristics indicate that the current galaxy was created by the merger of two galaxies, maybe two gas rich galaxies, maybe spirals, based on the amount of gas located around the galaxy. The lack of detection of molecular gas indicated that the merger took place 1-2 billion years ago. The merger remnant is characterised as a "fast rotator" that indicates either that the galaxy retained the angular momentum of the original galaxy or that the two galaxies merged in a way that they attained angular momentum.

The mean age of the stellar population of the central 0.3 kpc of NGC 680 is 7.8 billion years, while for the central 2.6 kpc the mean age is 6.5 billion years. Ionised gas has been detected in the nucleus of the galaxy, it is probably created by the gas emitted by stars at the end of their life. An arc of bluer and younger stars has been detected east of the galaxy.

== Nearby galaxies ==
NGC 680 is a member of a galaxy group known as the NGC 691 group. Other members of the group include IC 163, NGC 678, NGC 691, NGC 694, IC 167, and NGC 697. NGC 680 forms a pair with NGC 678, located 5.5 arcminutes to the northwest, and IC 1730 lies 3.7 arcminutes northwards.

Hydrogen emission surrounds both NGC 680 and the nearby NGC 678 and an HI tail has been found to extend towards NGC 691, with the total of this cloud HI mass estimated to by about 5×10^{9} M_{☉}. This gas was probably stripped by NGC 678 after a close encounter with NGC 680. However, with the use of deep photography, a stellar bridge between the two galaxies has not been detected, nor between NGC 680 and IC 1730.
