= NGC 935 and IC 1801 =

Pair of interacting galaxies in the constellation Aries

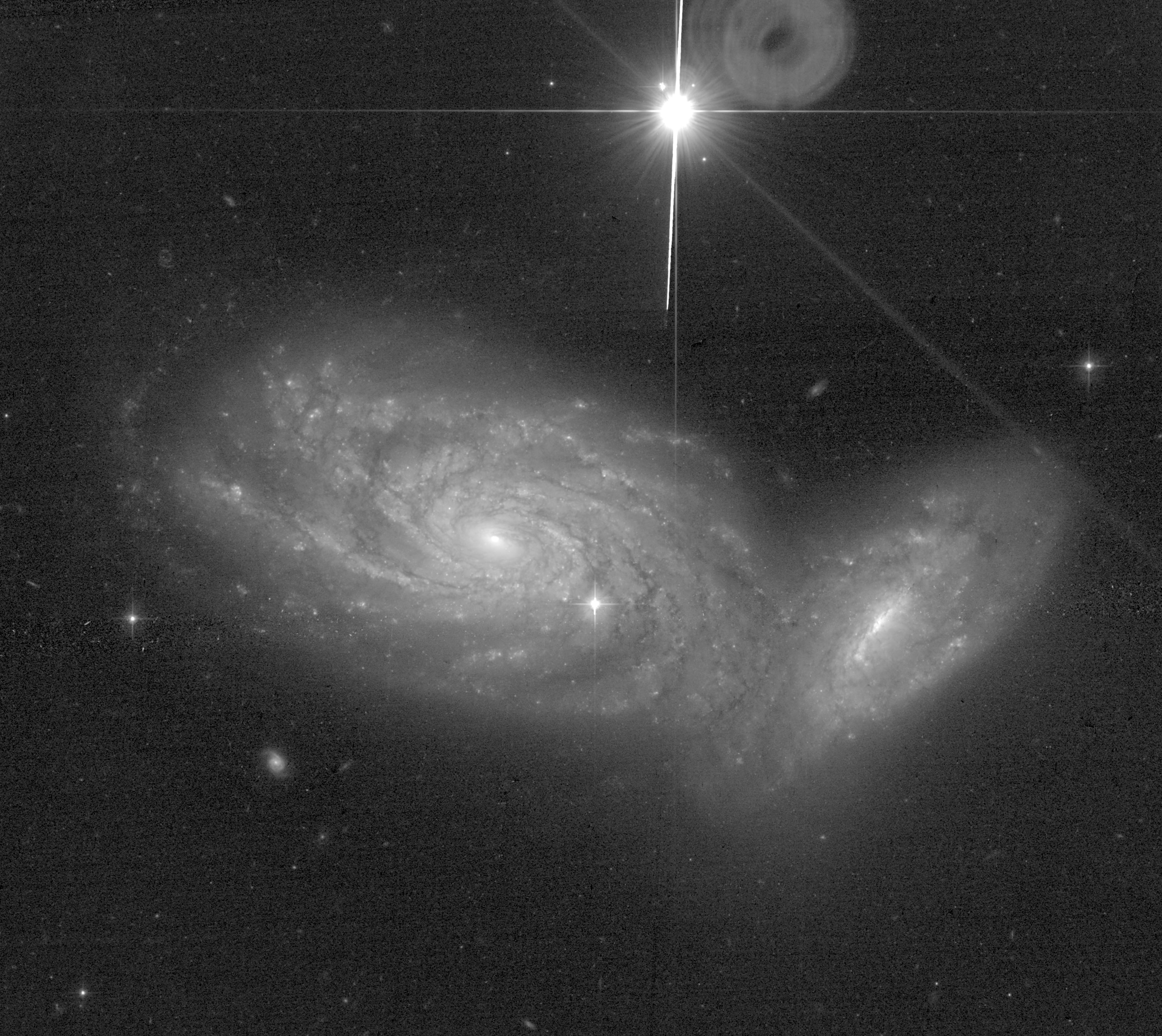
- NGC 935 (left) and IC 1801 (right) with the Hubble Space Telescope. The bright star at the top is TYC 1218-420-1

Observation data (J2000 epoch)
- Constellation: Aries
- Right ascension: 02^{h} 28^{m} 11.146^{s} / 02^{h} 28^{m} 12.753^{s}
- Declination: +19° 35′ 56.83″ / +19° 34′ 59.96″
- Redshift: 0.013807 / 0.013233
- Distance: 189 ± 13 Mly (57.8 ± 4.0 Mpc)
- Apparent magnitude (V): 12.5 / 14.56

Characteristics
- Type: Scd / SBb
- Apparent size (V): 1.857′ × 1.077′ / 1.517′ × 0.849′

Other designations
- 2MASX J02281114+1935568 / J02281275+1934599; ADBS J022807+1935; APG 276; IRAS 02253+1922; KPG 68 / 68b; LEDA 9388 / 9392; MCG+03-07-015 / +03-07-016; NGC 935; UGC 1937 / 1936; VV 238a / 238b; Z 0225.4+1922 / 0225.4+1921; Z 462-16 / 462-15

NGC 935 and IC 1801 are a pair of interacting galaxies within the constellation Aries. They were discovered on 18 September 1885 by Lewis Swift. NGC 935 is the northern member of the pair, and IC 1801 is the southern. Together, they are listed in Halton Arp's Atlas of Peculiar Galaxies as Arp 276, as an example of interacting galaxies.

== Supernovae ==
One supernova has been observed in NGC 935: SN 2006F (Type Ib, mag. 17.3) was discovered by Mirko Villi on 11 January 2006.

One supernova has been observed in IC 1801: SN 1976H (type unknown, mag. 15) was discovered by Miklós Lovas on 24 October 1976.
