= List of star systems within 150–200 light-years =

This is a list of star systems within 150–200 light years of Earth.

== List ==
Key
#	Visible to the unaided eye
$	Bright star (absolute magnitude of +8.5 or brighter)
‡	White dwarf
§	Brown dwarf or sub-brown dwarf
*	Nearest in constellation

System	Star or (sub-) brown dwarf	Distance (ly)	Constellation	Coordinates: RA, Dec (Ep J2000, Eq J2000)	Stellar class	Apparent magnitude (V)	Parallax (mas)	Notes and additional references
GD 61		150	Perseus	04^{h} 38^{m} 39.39^{s} +41° 09′ 32.5″	DBAZ3	14.8		
GD 362		150	Hercules	17^{h} 31^{m} 34.317^{s} +37° 05′ 20.71″	DAZB	16.23		
Beta³ Tucanae		150.4 ± 0.5	Tucana	00^{h} 32^{m} 43.905^{s} −63° 01′ 53.40″	A0V	+5.09		
HD 34445		150.5 ± 0.3	Orion	05^{h} 17^{m} 40.9804^{s} +07° 21′ 12.055″	G0V	7.31±0.03		Has 1 confirmed and 5 unconfirmed exoplanets.
GD 1400 (WD 0145-221)	A	151			DA			
GD 1400 (WD 0145-221)	B	151			L7			
HD 27482		151	Taurus		B8V			Part of Hyades Cluster.
HD 109492		151			G4IV			
Iota Eridani		151 ± 1	Eridanus	02^{h} 40^{m} 40.03501^{s} −39° 51′ 19.3541″	K0III	4.11	21.65±0.18	
12 Aquilae		151 ± 2	Aquila	19^{h} 01^{m} 40.82887^{s} −05° 44′ 20.7222″	K1III	4.02		
HD 188753	A	151 ± 5	Cygnus	19^{h} 54^{m} 58.37177^{s} +41° 52′ 17.5298″	G8V	7.43		
HD 188753	B	151 ± 5	Cygnus	19^{h} 54^{m} 58.37177^{s} +41° 52′ 17.5298″	K0V			
HD 188753	C	151 ± 5	Cygnus	19^{h} 54^{m} 58.37177^{s} +41° 52′ 17.5298″	K7V			
Alpha Piscium (Alrescha)	A	151 ± 7	Pisces	02^{h} 02^{m} 02.81972^{s} +02° 45′ 49.5410″	kA0hA7 Sr	3.82		
Alpha Piscium (Alrescha)	B	151 ± 7	Pisces	02^{h} 02^{m} 02.81972^{s} +02° 45′ 49.5410″	kA2hF2mF2 (IV)			
HD 50499		151.2 ± 0.2	Puppis	06^{h} 52^{m} 02.02432^{s} −33° 54′ 56.0164″	G0/2 V	7.21		Has two confirmed exoplanets (HD 50499b, c).
Epsilon Hydri		151.8 ± 0.6	Hydrus	02^{h} 39^{m} 35.36121^{s} −68° 16′ 01.0103″	B9 Va	4.12		
Theta¹ Tauri		152 ± 3	Taurus	04^{h} 28^{m} 34.49209^{s} +15° 57′ 44.2832″	G9 III Fe-0.5	3.84		Member of Hyades Open cluster.
Epsilon Draconis B		152.5 ± 0.3	Draco	19^{h} 48^{m} 10.54875^{s} +70° 16′ 07.5676″	F6V	6.80		
Gamma Apodis		153 ± 1	Apus	16^{h} 33^{m} 27.08252^{s} −78° 53′ 49.7334″	G9 III	3.86		
Epsilon Draconis A		153.0 ± 0.9	Draco	19^{h} 48^{m} 10.35046^{s} +70° 16′ 04.5491″	G7IIIbFe-1	3.91		
HD 45350 (Lucilinburhuc)		153.2 ± 0.2	Auriga	06^{h} 28^{m} 45.71108^{s} +38° 57′ 46.6665″	G5 V	7.89		
Phi Eridani		153.7 ± 0.9	Eridanus	02^{h} 16^{m} 30.58563^{s} −51° 30′ 43.7955″	B8IV-V	3.55		
IK Pegasi (HR 8210)	A	154 ± 1	Pegasus	21^{h} 26^{m} 26.66066^{s} +19° 22′ 32.3169″	A8m:	6.08		One of the closest type Ia supernova candidates to Earth.
IK Pegasi (HR 8210)	B	154 ± 1	Pegasus	21^{h} 26^{m} 26.66066^{s} +19° 22′ 32.3169″	DA			One of the closest type Ia supernova candidates to Earth.
Gamma Corvi (Gienah)		154 ± 1	Corvus	12^{h} 15^{m} 48.37081^{s} −17° 32′ 30.9496″	B8 III	2.585		
Kappa¹ Tauri		154 ± 2	Taurus	04^{h} 25^{m} 22.16505^{s} +22° 17′ 37.9375″	A7IV-V	4.22		Member of Hyades Open cluster.
Upsilon Tauri		154 ± 2	Taurus	04^{h} 26^{m} 18.46368^{s} +22° 48′ 48.8885″	A8 Vn	4.28 – 4.31		Member of Hyades Open cluster.
Gamma Tauri (Prima Hyadum)		154 ± 9	Taurus	04^{h} 19^{m} 47.6037^{s} +15° 37′ 39.512″	G8III	3.654		Member of Hyades Open cluster.
Delorme 1	A	154 ± 10	Phoenix	01^{h} 03^{m} 35.6551^{s} −55° 15′ 56.243″	M5/6	15.40 ±0.05		Has one confirmed exoplanet (Delorme 1b).
Delorme 1	B	154 ± 10	Phoenix	01^{h} 03^{m} 35.6551^{s} −55° 15′ 56.243″	M5/6			Has one confirmed exoplanet (Delorme 1b).
Delorme 1	C	154 ± 10	Phoenix	01^{h} 03^{m} 35.6551^{s} −55° 15′ 56.243″	L0(VLG)			Has one confirmed exoplanet (Delorme 1b).
PZ Telescopii (HD 174429)	A	154.1 ± 0.2	Telescopium	18^{h} 53^{m} 05.87351^{s} −50° 10′ 49.8974″	G9 IV	8.33 - 8.63		Has one known exoplanet.
PZ Telescopii (HD 174429)	B	154.1 ± 0.2	Telescopium	18^{h} 53^{m} 05.87351^{s} −50° 10′ 49.8974″	M7±1			Has one known exoplanet.
HD 3167		154.3 ± 0.1	Pisces	00^{h} 34^{m} 57.524^{s} +04° 22′ 53.28″	K0V	8.97		Has 4 exoplanets.
Gamma Draconis (Eltanin)		154.3 ± 0.7	Draco	17^{h} 56^{m} 36.36988^{s} +51° 29′ 20.0242″	K5 III	2.23		
TOI-2015		154.34±0.16			M4			Has two known exoplanets.
HIP 34269		154.81	Puppis	07^{h} 06^{m} 13.98^{s} −47° 35′ 13.87″	G			Has 4 exoplanets.
HD 283869		154.95	Taurus		K4			Member of Hyades Open cluster.
Beta Serpentis (Zhou)	A	155 ± 2	Serpens	15^{h} 46^{m} 11.25435^{s} +15° 25′ 18.5959″	A2 V or A2 IV	3.65		
Beta Serpentis (Zhou)	B	155 ± 2	Serpens	15^{h} 46^{m} 11.25435^{s} +15° 25′ 18.5959″	K3 V			
HD 20868 (Intan)		155.64 ± 0.10	Fornax	03^{h} 20^{m} 42.69371^{s} −33° 43′ 48.3735″	K3/4 III/V	9.92		Has one exoplanet (b / Baiduri)
HD 181327		155.8 ± 0.2	Telescopium	19^{h} 22^{m} 58.944^{s} −54° 32′ 16.98″	F6V	7.04±0.01		
Eta Sagittae		155.9 ± 0.9	Sagitta	20^{h} 05^{m} 09.49303^{s} +19° 59′ 27.8575″	K2 III	+5.09		
Beta Apodis		156 ± 1	Apus	16^{h} 43^{m} 04.659^{s} −77° 31′ 02.76″	K0 III	+4.24		
Omega² Aquarii	A	156 ± 1	Aquarius	23^{h} 42^{m} 43.345^{s} −14° 32′ 41.66″	B9V	4.49		
Omega² Aquarii	B	156 ± 1	Aquarius	23^{h} 42^{m} 43.345^{s} −14° 32′ 41.66″	A5V			
Delta¹ Tauri (Secunda Hyadum)		156 ± 4	Taurus	04^{h} 22^{m} 56.09253^{s} +17° 32′ 33.0487″	G9.5 III CN0.5	3.772		Member of Hyades Open cluster.
Mu Aquarii		157 ± 2	Aquarius	20^{h} 52^{m} 39.23277^{s} −08° 58′ 59.9499″	A3m or kA4hF1mF3 (III) EuSr	4.731		
Theta² Tauri (Chamukuy)		157 ± 3	Taurus	04^{h} 28^{m} 39.74455^{s} +15° 52′ 15.1226″	A7 III	3.35 - 3.42		Member of Hyades Open cluster.
Gamma Capricorni (Nashira)		157 ± 5	Capricornus	21^{h} 40^{m} 05.445^{s} −16° 39′ 44.54″	kF0hF1VmF2	3.67		
HD 209458		157.0 ± 0.2	Pegasus	22^{h} 03^{m} 10.77275^{s} +18° 53′ 03.5494″	F9 V or G0 V	7.65		Has one confirmed exoplanet (HD 209458 b).
HD 204313		157.0 ± 0.3	Capricornus	21^{h} 28^{m} 12.20609^{s} −21° 43′ 34.5182″	G5V	7.99		Has 3 exoplanets.
38 Boötis (Merga)		157.4 ± 0.5	Boötes	14^{h} 49^{m} 18.67062^{s} +46° 06′ 58.3369″	F6 IVs	5.76		
HD 153950 (Rapeto)		157.9 ± 0.2	Scorpius	17^{h} 04^{m} 30.87068^{s} −43° 18′ 35.1661″	F8V	7.39		Has one exoplanet (Trimobe).
Eta Telescopii	A	158.3 ± 0.8	Telescopium	19^{h} 22^{m} 51.20608^{s} −54° 25′ 26.1456″	A0 Vn	+5.05		
Eta Telescopii	B	158.3 ± 0.8	Telescopium	19^{h} 22^{m} 51.20608^{s} −54° 25′ 26.1456″	M7V/M8V			
WD J181058.67+311940.94	A	160	Hercules	18^{h} 10^{m} 58.67^{s} +31° 19′ 40.94″	D			One of the closest type Ia supernova candidates to Earth.
WD J181058.67+311940.94	B	160	Hercules	18^{h} 10^{m} 58.67^{s} +31° 19′ 40.94″	D			One of the closest type Ia supernova candidates to Earth.
Alpha Reticuli (Rhombus)		160 ± 1	Reticulum	04^{h} 14^{m} 25.47^{s} −62° 28′ 25.7″	G8 II-III	3.315		
Alpha Crateris (Alkes)		160 ± 1	Crater	10^{h} 59^{m} 46.46516^{s} −18° 17′ 55.6304″	K1 III	4.07		
Rho Boötis (Kalasungsang)		160 ± 1	Boötes	14^{h} 31^{m} 49.789^{s} +30° 22′ 17.17″	K4 III	3.59		
Beta Leporis (Nihal)		160 ± 1	Lepus	05^{h} 28^{m} 14.72316^{s} −20° 45′ 33.9878″	G5 II	2.84		
4 Equulei		160 ± 10	Equuleius	21^{h} 05^{m} 26.71378^{s} +05° 57′ 29.5655″	F8V + ?			
BD+14 4559 (Solaris)		160.8 ± 0.1	Pegasus	21^{h} 13^{m} 35.99016^{s} +14° 41′ 21.7858″	K2V	9.78		Has 1 known exoplanet (b / Pirx) and 1 unconfirmed.
Kappa¹ Boötis (Asellus Tertius)		161 ± 2	Boötes	14^{h} 13^{m} 27.824^{s} +51° 47′ 16.62″	F2V	+6.69		
HD 100777 (Sagarmatha)		161.8 ± 0.2	Leo	11^{h} 35^{m} 51.52322^{s} −04° 45′ 20.5046″	G8V	8.42		
Kappa² Boötis (Asellus Tertius)		161.8 ± 0.8	Boötes	14^{h} 13^{m} 29.008^{s} +51° 47′ 23.88″	A8IV	+4.50 to +4.58		Has one known exoplanet (b / Laligurans).
Beta Canis Minoris (Gomeisa)		162 ± 2	Canis Minor	07^{h} 27^{m} 09.04174^{s} +08° 17′ 21.5368″	B8V			
Tau Pegasi (Salm)		162 ± 3	Pegasus	23^{h} 20^{m} 38.24188^{s} +23° 44′ 25.2098″	A5 Vp A8V(n)kA5mA5 (λ Boo)	4.58		
WASP-80 (Petra)		162.2 ± 0.2	Aquila	20^{h} 12^{m} 40.1694^{s} −02° 08′ 39.187″	K7	11.939		Has 1 known exoplanet.
Nu Aquarii		162.4 ± 0.9	Aquarius	21^{h} 09^{m} 35.648^{s} −11° 22′ 18.09″	G8 III	4.520		
98 Aquarii (b¹ Aquarii)		163 ± 2	Aquarius	23^{h} 22^{m} 58.22606^{s} −20° 06′ 02.0963″	K0 III	3.97		
Gamma Librae (Zubenelhakrabi)		163 ± 2	Libra	15^{h} 35^{m} 31.57881^{s} −14° 47′ 22.3278″	G8.5 III	3.91		
107 Aquarii B (i² Aquarii)		163 ± 3	Aquarius	23^{h} 46^{m} 00.92254^{s} −18° 40′ 42.0313″	F2 V	6.72		
50 parsecs (about 163.08 ly)
AB Pictoris (HD 44627)		163.5 ± 0.1	Pictor	06^{h} 19^{m} 12.913^{s} −58° 03′ 15.53″	K1V(e)	9.13		Has two known exoplanets.
Rho Andromedae		163.5±0.6	Andromeda	00^{h} 21^{m} 07.26896^{s} +37° 58′ 06.9727″	F5IV-V	5.19	19.9513±0.0739	
Theta¹ Eridani (Acamar)		164 ± 2	Eridanus	02^{h} 58^{m} 15.6764^{s} −40° 18′ 16.839″	A3IV-V	3.18		
Gamma Aquarii (Sadachbia)		164 ± 9	Aquarius	22^{h} 21^{m} 39.37542^{s} −01° 23′ 14.4031″	A0 V	3.849		
WASP-69 (Wouri)		164.0 ± 0.1	Aquarius	21^{h} 00^{m} 06.19682^{s} −05° 05′ 40.0349″	K5V	9.87±0.03		Has 1 exoplanet (Makombé).
HIP 14810		164.9 ± 0.4	Aries	03^{h} 11^{m} 14.2302^{s} +21° 05′ 50.493″	G6V	8.585±0.016		Has 3 exoplanets.
Delta Arietis (Botein)		165 ± 1	Aries	03^{h} 11^{m} 37.767^{s} +19° 43′ 36.02″	K2 III	4.349		
Theta Leonis (Chertan)		165 ± 1	Leo	11^{h} 14^{m} 14.40446^{s} +15° 25′ 46.4541″	A2 V	3.324		
Delta Cygni (Fawaris)		165 ± 4	Cygnus	19^{h} 44^{m} 58.47854^{s} +45° 07′ 50.9161″	A0 IV	2.87		
BD−22 5866	A	166	Aquarius	22^{h} 14^{m} 38.3637^{s} −21° 41′ 53.199″	K7	10.1		
BD−22 5866	B	166	Aquarius	22^{h} 14^{m} 38.3637^{s} −21° 41′ 53.199″	K7			
BD−22 5866	C	166	Aquarius	22^{h} 14^{m} 38.3637^{s} −21° 41′ 53.199″	M1			
BD−22 5866	D	166	Aquarius	22^{h} 14^{m} 38.3637^{s} −21° 41′ 53.199″	M2			
Gamma Arietis (Mesarthim)	A	166 ± 1	Aries	01^{h} 53^{m} 31.813^{s} +19° 17′ 37.88″	A0Vnp λ Boo or A0IV-V(n)kB8	3.86		
Gamma Arietis (Mesarthim)	B	166 ± 1	Aries	01^{h} 53^{m} 31.813^{s} +19° 17′ 37.88″	A2IVpSiSrCr			
Theta Aurigae (Mahasim)	A	166 ± 1	Auriga	05^{h} 59^{m} 43.27012^{s} +37° 12′ 45.3047″	A0pSi	2.62–2.70		
Theta Aurigae (Mahasim)	B	166 ± 1	Auriga	05^{h} 59^{m} 43.27012^{s} +37° 12′ 45.3047″	F2-5V			
41 Arietis (Bharani)		166 ± 2	Aries	02^{h} 49^{m} 59.03324^{s} +27° 15′ 37.8260″	B8 Vn	3.63		
Beta² Tucanae	A	166 ± 8	Tucana	00^{h} 31^{m} 32.6709^{s} −62° 57′ 29.587″	A2V	+4.54		
Beta² Tucanae	B	166 ± 8	Tucana	00^{h} 31^{m} 32.6709^{s} −62° 57′ 29.587″	A7V + ?			
Theta² Eridani		167 ± 1	Eridanus	02^{h} 58^{m} 16.4037^{s} −40° 18′ 16.906″	A1V	4.11		
HD 133131	A	168 ± 1	Libra	15^{h} 03^{m} 35.44599^{s} −27° 50′ 33.2195″	G2	8.40 + 8.42		Has 3 exoplanets.
HD 133131	B	168 ± 1	Libra	15^{h} 03^{m} 35.44599^{s} −27° 50′ 33.2195″	G2			Has 3 exoplanets.
Kappa Andromedae (Kaffalmusalsala)		168±2	Andromeda	23^{h} 40^{m} 24.508^{s} +44° 20′ 02.16″	A0V	4.139	19.4064±0.2104	Has one confirmed exoplanet (Kappa Andromedae b).
Eta Aquarii		168 ± 2	Aquarius	22^{h} 35^{m} 21.38126^{s} −00° 07′ 02.9888″	B9IV-Vn	4.04		
HD 202908	A	168.6 ± 0.5	Equuleus	21^{h} 18^{m} 34.85^{s} +11° 34′ 08.2″	F9V or G1V			
HD 202908	B	168.6 ± 0.5	Equuleus	21^{h} 18^{m} 34.85^{s} +11° 34′ 08.2″	G0V or G2V			
HD 202908	C	168.6 ± 0.5	Equuleus	21^{h} 18^{m} 34.85^{s} +11° 34′ 08.2″	G1.5V or G6V			
Epsilon Andromedae		169±1	Andromeda	00^{h} 38^{m} 33.347^{s} +29° 18′ 42.31″	G6III Fe−3 CH1	4.357	19.2451±0.1188	
Omicron Geminorum (Jishui)		169 ± 1	Gemini	07^{h} 39^{m} 09.93466^{s} +34° 35′ 03.5028″	F5-6 IV	4.90		
Gamma Comae Berenices		169 ± 2	Coma Berenices	12^{h} 26^{m} 56.273^{s} +28° 16′ 06.318″	K1 III Fe0.5	4.36		
51 Andromedae (Nembus)		169 ± 4	Andromeda	01^{h} 37^{m} 59.56074^{s} +48° 37′ 41.5798″	K3- III CN0.5	3.57		
Nu Horologii		169.3 ± 0.6	Horologium	02^{h} 49^{m} 01.487^{s} −62° 48′ 23.48″	A2 V	5.253±0.006		Has a close encounter with F-type star Alpha Fornacis.
Zeta Piscium (Revati)	A	170	Pisces	01^{h} 13^{m} 45.17477^{s} +07° 34′ 31.2745″	A7IV	5.28 + 6.43		
Zeta Piscium (Revati)	B	170	Pisces	01^{h} 13^{m} 45.17477^{s} +07° 34′ 31.2745″	A7IV			
Zeta Piscium (Revati)	C	170	Pisces	01^{h} 13^{m} 45.17477^{s} +07° 34′ 31.2745″	F7V			
Zeta Piscium (Revati)	D	170	Pisces	01^{h} 13^{m} 45.17477^{s} +07° 34′ 31.2745″	G7V + ?			
Upsilon Pegasi (Alkarab)		170 ± 2	Pegasus	23^{h} 25^{m} 22.78350^{s} +23° 24′ 14.7606″	F8III	4.40		
Delta Ophiuchi (Yed Prior)		171 ± 1	Ophiuchus	16^{h} 14^{m} 20.73853^{s} −03° 41′ 39.5612″	M0.5 III	2.75		
BX Trianguli		171.8 ± 0.2	Triangulum	02^{h} 20^{m} 50.85419^{s} +33° 20′ 47.4683″	M2+?		13.366±0.006	Has one known exoplanet.
Delta Ursae Minoris (Yildun)		172 ± 1	Ursa Minor	17^{h} 32^{m} 12.99671^{s} +86° 35′ 11.2584″	A1 Van	4.36		
39 Arietis (Lilii Borea)		172 ± 2	Aries	02^{h} 47^{m} 54.54142^{s} +29° 14′ 49.6132″	K1.5 III	4.514		
Theta Andromedae	A	173±4	Andromeda	00^{h} 17^{m} 05.50236^{s} +38° 40′ 53.8886″	A2V	4.61	18.8747±0.4251	
Theta Andromedae	B	173±4	Andromeda	00^{h} 17^{m} 05.50236^{s} +38° 40′ 53.8886″	A	4.61	18.8747±0.4251	
Lambda Ophiuchi (Marfik)	A	173 ± 5	Ophiuchus	16^{h} 30^{m} 54.82314^{s} +01° 59′ 02.1209″	A0V	3.82		
Lambda Ophiuchi (Marfik)	B	173 ± 5	Ophiuchus	16^{h} 30^{m} 54.82314^{s} +01° 59′ 02.1209″	A4V			
Lambda Virginis (Khambalia)	A	173.4 ± 0.9	Virgo	14^{h} 19^{m} 06.59235^{s} −13° 22′ 15.9459″	A1 V	4.52		
Lambda Virginis (Khambalia)	B	173.4 ± 0.9	Virgo	14^{h} 19^{m} 06.59235^{s} −13° 22′ 15.9459″	A1 V			
HD 191939		174.4 ± 0.1	Draco	20^{h} 08^{m} 05.75515^{s} +66° 51′ 02.0766″	G9V	8.971		Has 7 exoplanets.
Pi Cassiopeiae$	A	175 ± 1	Cassiopeia	00^{h} 43^{m} 28.070^{s} +47° 01′ 28.36″	A5V	4.949#	18.6293±0.1142	
Pi Cassiopeiae$	B	175 ± 1	Cassiopeia	00^{h} 43^{m} 28.070^{s} +47° 01′ 28.36″	A5V	4.949#	18.6293±0.1142	
Zeta Boötis	A	176 ± 7	Boötes	14^{h} 41^{m} 08.95158^{s} +13° 43′ 41.8967″	A1V	3.78		
Zeta Boötis	B	176 ± 7	Boötes	14^{h} 41^{m} 08.95158^{s} +13° 43′ 41.8967″	F0V			
Beta Gruis (Tiaki)		177 ± 4	Grus	22^{h} 42^{m} 40.05027^{s} −46° 53′ 04.4752″	M4.5 III	2.146		
Alphard (Alpha Hydrae)		177 ± 8	Hydra	09^{h} 27^{m} 35.2433^{s} −08° 39′ 30.969″	K3IIIa	+2.00		
Acubens (Alpha Cancri)		178 ± 3	Cancer	08^{h} 58^{m} 29.2042^{s} +11° 51′ 27.649″	kA7VmF0/2III/IVSr	4.20 to 4.27		
R Doradus		178 ± 10	Dorado	04^{h} 36^{m} 45.59127^{s} −62° 04′ 37.7974″	M8 III	4.78 – 6.32		The star with the largest angular diameter besides the Sun, and one of the closest asymptotic giant branch stars.
Xi Aquarii (Bunda)		179 ± 1	Aquarius	21^{h} 37^{m} 45.110^{s} −07° 51′ 15.13″	A7 V	4.690		
Epsilon Aquilae (Arin-majlep)		179 ± 3	Aquila	18^{h} 59^{m} 37.356^{s} +15° 04′ 05.81″	K1-IIICN0.5	4.02		
Alpha Pavonis (Peacock)		179 ± 5	Pavo	20^{h} 25^{m} 38.85705^{s} −56° 44′ 06.3230″	B3V	1.94		
HD 99109 (Shama)		179.4 ± 0.2	Leo	11^{h} 24^{m} 17.359^{s} −01° 31′ 44.67″	G8/K0IV	9.10		Has one known exoplanet (b / Perwana).
Kappa¹ Lupi		180 ± 5	Lupus	15^{h} 11^{m} 56.07286^{s} −48° 44′ 16.1692″	B9.5 Vne	3.86		
Epsilon Equulei	A	180 ± 10	Equuleus	20^{h} 59^{m} 04.47539^{s} +04° 17′ 36.5211″	F5(V)	5.23		
Epsilon Equulei	B	180 ± 10	Equuleus	20^{h} 59^{m} 04.47539^{s} +04° 17′ 36.5211″	F6(V)			
HD 8535	A	180.5 ± 0.2	Phoenix	01^{h} 23^{m} 37.23585^{s} −41° 16′ 11.2795″	G0V	7.70		
HD 8535	B	180.5 ± 0.2	Phoenix	01^{h} 23^{m} 37.23585^{s} −41° 16′ 11.2795″	D			
Omicron Ursae Majoris (Muscida)		182 ± 1	Ursa Major	08^{h} 30^{m} 15.87064^{s} +60° 43′ 05.4115″	G5III:	3.35		
Zeta Andromedae (Shimu)	Aa$	181±2	Andromeda	00^{h} 47^{m} 20.326^{s} +24° 16′ 01.84″	K1III	3.92 to 4.14#	18.0083±0.1604	
Zeta Andromedae (Shimu)	Ab	181±2	Andromeda	00^{h} 47^{m} 20.326^{s} +24° 16′ 01.84″	KV	3.92 to 4.14#	18.0083±0.1604	
Gamma Cancri (Asellus Borealis)		181 ± 2	Cancer	08^{h} 43^{m} 17.147^{s} +21° 28′ 06.60″	A1IV	4.673		
HD 156411 (Inquill)		181.5 ± 0.2	Ara	17^{h} 19^{m} 51.40072^{s} −48° 32′ 57.5600″	G1V(w)	6.67		Has one exoplanet (b / Sumajmajta).
Alpha Sagittarii (Rukbat)		182 ± 2	Sagittarius	19^{h} 23^{m} 53.17483^{s} −40° 36′ 57.3705″	B8 V	+3.97		
HD 109271	A	182.1 ± 0.4	Virgo	12^{h} 33^{m} 35.555^{s} −11° 37′ 18.73″	G5 V	8.05 ± 0.01		Has 2 confirmed and 1 unconfirmed exoplanets.
HD 109271	B	182.1 ± 0.4	Virgo	12^{h} 33^{m} 35.555^{s} −11° 37′ 18.73″	DA			Has 2 confirmed and 1 unconfirmed exoplanets.
HD 221287 (Poerava)		182.7 ± 0.4	Tucana	23^{h} 31^{m} 20.33846^{s} −58° 12′ 35.0336″	F7V	7.82		Has one exoplanet (b / Pipitea).
Epsilon Sextantis		183	Sextans	10^{h} 17^{m} 37.80200^{s} −08° 04′ 08.0898″	F2III			
Alpha Tucanae (Lang-Exster)		184 ± 3	Tucana	22^{h} 18^{m} 30.11244^{s} −60° 15′ 34.6664″	K3 III	2.86		
HD 199942		184 ± 5	Equuleus	21^{h} 00^{m} 03.99267^{s} +07° 30′ 58.3018″	F1Vp or F1VgF1mA8			
Beta Librae (Zubeneschamali)		185 ± 2	Libra	15^{h} 17^{m} 00.41382^{s} −09° 22′ 58.4919″	B8 V	2.61		
Xi Aquilae (Libertas)		186 ± 1	Aquila	19^{h} 54^{m} 14.8815^{s} +08° 27′ 41.235″	G9.5 IIIb	4.722		
Omicron² Orionis		186 ±	Orion	04^{h} 56^{m} 22.27612^{s} +13° 30′ 52.0932″	K2 IIIb	4.06		
Gamma Pictoris		186 ± 2	Pictor	05^{h} 49^{m} 49.66006^{s} −56° 09′ 59.9978″	K1III	4.50	17.5764±0.1536	
Tau² Eridani (Angetenar)		187 ± 2	Eridanus	02^{h} 51^{m} 02.32186^{s} −21° 00′ 14.4654″	K0 III	4.78		
HD 125612	A	188.6 ± 0.3	Virgo	14^{h} 20^{m} 53.518^{s} −17° 28′ 53.49″	G3V	8.31		Has 3 exoplanets.
HD 125612	B	188.6 ± 0.3	Virgo	14^{h} 20^{m} 53.518^{s} −17° 28′ 53.49″	M3-4V			Has 3 exoplanets.
3 Andromedae		189 ± 1	Andromeda	23^{h} 04^{m} 10.98269^{s} +50° 03′ 07.5255″	K0 IIIb	4.64		
Upsilon² Cassiopeiae (Castula)		189 ± 2	Cassiopeia	00^{h} 56^{m} 39.905^{s} +59° 10′ 51.81″	G8 IIIb Fe−0.5	+4.62		
Alpha Equulei (Kitalpha)	A	190 ± 2	Equuleus	21^{h} 15^{m} 49.437^{s} +05° 14′ 52.41″	G7III	+3.919		
Alpha Equulei (Kitalpha)	B	190 ± 2	Equuleus	21^{h} 15^{m} 49.437^{s} +05° 14′ 52.41″	kA3hA4mA9			
Gamma Trianguli Australis		190 ± 4	Triangulum	15^{h} 18^{m} 54.58129^{s} −68° 40′ 46.3680″	A1III	2.87		
Theta Aquarii (Ancha)		191 ± 2	Aquarius	22^{h} 16^{m} 50.037^{s} −07° 46′ 59.84″	G8 III–IV	4.175		
Gamma Eridani (Zaurak)		192 ± 3	Eridanus	03^{h} 58^{m} 01.76695^{s} −13° 30′ 30.6698″	M0III-IIIb	2.88 - 2.96		
K2-136	A	192.1 ± 0.2	Taurus	04^{h} 29^{m} 38.9939^{s} +22° 52′ 57.794″	K5V or K5.5V	11.200±0.010		Has three confirmed exoplanet (K2-136b, c & d). Member of Hyades Open cluster.
K2-136	B	192.1 ± 0.2	Taurus	04^{h} 29^{m} 38.9939^{s} +22° 52′ 57.794″	M7/8V			Has three confirmed exoplanet (K2-136b, c & d). Member of Hyades Open cluster.
HD 181720 (Sika)		195.6 ± 0.3	Sagittarius	19^{h} 22^{m} 52.985^{s} −32° 55′ 08.59″	G1V	7.84		Has one exoplanet (b / Toge).
HD 16175 (Buna)		195.7 ± 0.3	Andromeda	02^{h} 37^{m} 01.91118^{s} +42° 03′ 45.4685″	F8 IV	7.28		Has one exoplanet (b / Abol).
Beta Pegasi (Scheat)		196 ± 2	Pegasus	23^{h} 03^{m} 46.45746^{s} +28° 04′ 58.0336″	M2.5II–IIIe	2.42		
Eta Pegasi (Matar)		196 ± 8	Pegasus	22^{h} 43^{m} 00.13743^{s} +30° 13′ 16.4822″	G2 II + F0 V	2.95		
35 Aquilae (V1431 Aquilae)		196.9 ± 0.5	Aquila	19^{h} 29^{m} 00.98694^{s} +01° 57′ 01.6168″	A0V	5.80		
Mirach (Beta Andromedae)$		197 ± 7	Andromeda	01^{h} 09^{m} 43.91^{s} +35° 37′ 13.8″	M0III	2.067 (2.01 to 2.10)#	16.52±0.56	
HD 68988 (Násti)		197.0 ± 0.3	Ursa Major	08^{h} 18^{m} 22.17286^{s} +61° 27′ 38.5950″	G0V or G2V or G2IV	8.20		Has two exoplanets (b / Albmi, c)
Chi Ursae Majoris (Taiyangshou)		198 ± 1	Ursa Major	11^{h} 46^{m} 03.01407^{s} +47° 46′ 45.8553″	K0.5 IIIb	3.72		
Delta Virginis (Minelauva)		198 ± 3	Virgo	12^{h} 55^{m} 36.20861^{s} +03° 23′ 50.8932″	M3+ III	3.32 - 3.40		
Alpha Scuti (Tianbian)		199 ± 3	Scutum	18^{h} 35^{m} 12.42776^{s} −08° 14′ 38.6529″	K3III	3.83		
System	Star or (sub-) brown dwarf	Distance (ly)	Constellation	Coordinates: RA, Dec (Ep J2000, Eq J2000)	Stellar class	Apparent magnitude (V)	Parallax (mas)	Notes and additional references

== See also ==
- List of star systems within 100–150 light-years
- List of star systems within 200–250 light-years
