= Apus in Chinese astronomy =

The modern constellation Apus is not included in the Three Enclosures and Twenty-Eight Mansions system of traditional Chinese uranography because its stars are too far south for observers in China to know about them prior to the introduction of Western star charts. Based on the work of Xu Guangqi and the German Jesuit missionary Johann Adam Schall von Bell in the late Ming Dynasty, this constellation has been classified as one of the 23 Southern Asterisms (近南極星區, Jìnnánjíxīngōu) under the name Exotic Bird (異雀, Yìquè).

The name of the western constellation in modern Chinese is 天燕座 (tiān yàn zuò), meaning "the heaven swallow constellation".

== Stars ==
The map of Chinese constellation in constellation Apus area consists of :

Four Symbols	Mansion (Chinese name)	Romanization	Translation	Asterisms (Chinese name)	Romanization	Translation	Western star name	Proper Name	Chinese star name	Romanization	Translation
-	近南極星區 (non-mansions)	Jìnnánjíxīngōu (non-mansions)	The Southern Asterisms (non-mansions)	異雀	Yìquè	Exotic Bird					
-	近南極星區 (non-mansions)	Jìnnánjíxīngōu (non-mansions)	The Southern Asterisms (non-mansions)	異雀	Yìquè	Exotic Bird	ζ Aps		異雀一	Yìquèyī	1st star
-	近南極星區 (non-mansions)	Jìnnánjíxīngōu (non-mansions)	The Southern Asterisms (non-mansions)	異雀	Yìquè	Exotic Bird	ι Aps		異雀二	Yìquèèr	2nd star
-	近南極星區 (non-mansions)	Jìnnánjíxīngōu (non-mansions)	The Southern Asterisms (non-mansions)	異雀	Yìquè	Exotic Bird	β Aps		異雀三	Yìquèsān	3rd star
-	近南極星區 (non-mansions)	Jìnnánjíxīngōu (non-mansions)	The Southern Asterisms (non-mansions)	異雀	Yìquè	Exotic Bird	γ Aps		異雀四	Yìquèsì	4th star
-	近南極星區 (non-mansions)	Jìnnánjíxīngōu (non-mansions)	The Southern Asterisms (non-mansions)	異雀	Yìquè	Exotic Bird	δ^{1} Aps		異雀六	Yìquèliù	6th star
-	近南極星區 (non-mansions)	Jìnnánjíxīngōu (non-mansions)	The Southern Asterisms (non-mansions)	異雀	Yìquè	Exotic Bird	η Aps		異雀七	Yìquèqī	7th star
-	近南極星區 (non-mansions)	Jìnnánjíxīngōu (non-mansions)	The Southern Asterisms (non-mansions)	異雀	Yìquè	Exotic Bird	α Aps	Paradys	異雀八	Yìquèbā	8th star
-	近南極星區 (non-mansions)	Jìnnánjíxīngōu (non-mansions)	The Southern Asterisms (non-mansions)	異雀	Yìquè	Exotic Bird	ε Aps		異雀九	Yìquèjiǔ	9th star
-	近南極星區 (non-mansions)	Jìnnánjíxīngōu (non-mansions)	The Southern Asterisms (non-mansions)	三角形	Sānjiǎoxíng	Triangle					
-	近南極星區 (non-mansions)	Jìnnánjíxīngōu (non-mansions)	The Southern Asterisms (non-mansions)	三角形	Sānjiǎoxíng	Triangle	κ¹ Aps		三角形增三	Sānjiǎoxíngzēngsān	3rd additional star
-	近南極星區 (non-mansions)	Jìnnánjíxīngōu (non-mansions)	The Southern Asterisms (non-mansions)	三角形	Sānjiǎoxíng	Triangle	κ² Aps		三角形增四	Sānjiǎoxíngzēngsì	4th additional star

== See also ==
- Chinese astronomy
- Traditional Chinese star names
- Chinese constellations
