= Delta Octantis =

Star in the constellation Octans

δ Octantis
- Location of δ Octantis (circled)

Observation data Epoch J2000 Equinox ICRS
- Constellation: Octans
- Right ascension: 14^{h} 26^{m} 55.23244^{s}
- Declination: −83° 40′ 04.3868″
- Apparent magnitude (V): 4.31

Characteristics
- Spectral type: K2III
- U−B color index: +1.45
- B−V color index: +1.31

Astrometry
Radial velocity (R_{v})	+4.60 km/s
Proper motion (μ)	RA: −96.12 mas/yr Dec.: −13.27 mas/yr
Parallax (π)	10.91±0.14 mas
Distance	299 ± 4 ly (92 ± 1 pc)
Absolute magnitude (M_{V})	−0.35±0.09

Details
Mass	1.06 M_{☉}
Radius	24.61 R_{☉}
Luminosity	271 L_{☉}
Surface gravity (log g)	1.89 cgs
Temperature	4,311 K
Metallicity [Fe/H]	−0.42 dex
Rotational velocity (v sin i)	1.1 km/s

Other designations
- CD−83°189, GC 19349, HIP 70638, HR 5339, HD 124882, NSV 6636, SAO 258698

Database references
SIMBAD	data

δ Octantis, Latinised as Delta Octantis, has the distinction of being Saturn's southern pole star. An orange giant of class K2III, it has 1.2 times the mass of the Sun and about 25 times the Sun's radius. This star is about 4.3 billion years old, which is similar to the age of the Sun.

== Naming ==
In Chinese caused by adaptation of the European southern hemisphere constellations into the Chinese system, 異雀 (Yì Què), meaning Exotic Bird, refers to an asterism consisting of δ Octantis, ζ Apodis, ι Apodis, β Apodis, γ Apodis, δ^{1} Apodis, η Apodis, α Apodis and ε Apodis. Consequently, δ Octantis itself is known as 異雀五 (Yì Què wǔ, English: the Fifth Star of Exotic Bird).
