= GG Tauri =

Star in the constellation Taurus

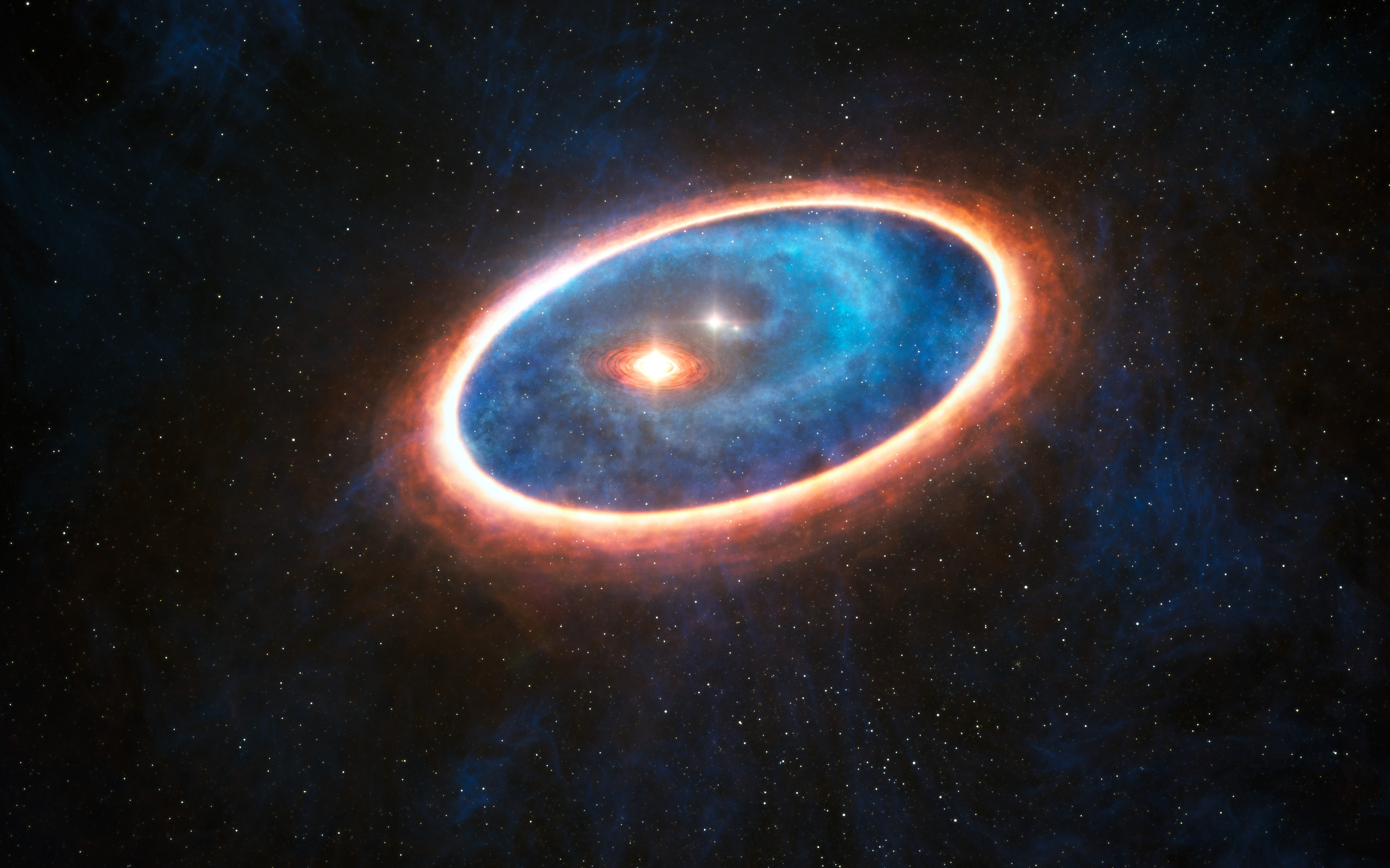
- Artist's impression of the disk surrounding GG Tauri A Credit: ESO/L. Calçada

Observation data Epoch J2000 Equinox ICRS
- Constellation: Taurus
- GG Tauri A
- Right ascension: 04^{h} 32^{m} 30.31^{s}
- Declination: +17° 31′ 41.0″
- Apparent magnitude (V): 12.25 ± 0.03 / 14.70 ± 0.06
- GG Tauri Ba
- Right ascension: 04^{h} 32^{m} 30.25^{s}
- Declination: +17° 31′ 30.9″
- Apparent magnitude (V): 17.11 ± 0.07
- GG Tauri Bb
- Right ascension: 04^{h} 32^{m} 30.31^{s}
- Declination: +17° 31′ 29.9″
- Apparent magnitude (V): 19.94 ± 0.08

Characteristics
- Spectral type: K7 / M2 / M3 / M5 / M7
- U−B color index: +0.06
- B−V color index: +1.38
- Variable type: T Tauri

Astrometry
Radial velocity (R_{v})	12.0 km/s
Proper motion (μ)	RA: 15.6 mas/yr Dec.: -21.1 mas/yr
Distance	450 ly (140 pc)

Orbit
Primary	GG Tau Aa
Name	GG Tau Ab
Period (P)	239+140 −53 yr
Semi-major axis (a)	43.2+15.7 −6.6 au
Eccentricity (e)	0.235+0.150 −0.053
Inclination (i)	138.0+6.1 −5.9°
Longitude of the node (Ω)	116.7+7.9 −11.5°
Periastron epoch (T)	72039+7700 −6700 MJD
Argument of periastron (ω) (secondary)	48+43 −30°

Orbit
Primary	GG Tau Ab1
Name	GG Tau Ab2
Period (P)	8.056+0.094 −0.093 yr
Semi-major axis (a)	3.44+0.15 −0.11 au
Eccentricity (e)	0.450+0.035 −0.027
Inclination (i)	154.2+10.0 −8.6°
Longitude of the node (Ω)	95+41 −23°
Periastron epoch (T)	57939+108 −68 MJD
Argument of periastron (ω) (secondary)	241+31 −18°

Details

GG Tau Aa
Mass	0.79±0.10 M_{☉}
Radius	1.63 R_{☉}
Luminosity	0.38 L_{☉}
Temperature	3700 K
Age	1.5 Myr

GG Tau Ab1
Mass	0.512+0.069 −0.051 M_{☉}
Luminosity	0.133 L_{☉}
Temperature	3300 K
Age	1.5 Myr

GG Tau Ab
Mass	0.106+0.017 −0.013 M_{☉}
Luminosity	0.067 L_{☉}
Temperature	3100 K
Age	1.5 Myr

GG Tau Ba
Mass	0.12 ± 0.02 M_{☉}
Radius	1.45 R_{☉}
Luminosity	0.096 L_{☉}
Age	1.5 Myr

GG Tauri Bb
Mass	0.04 ± 0.003 M_{☉}
Radius	0.497 R_{☉}
Luminosity	0.015 L_{☉}
Age	1.5 Myr

Other designations
- GG Tau, WDS J04325+1732, TYC 1270-897-1

Database references
SIMBAD	data

GG Tauri, often abbreviated as GG Tau, is a quintuple star system in the constellation Taurus. At a distance of about 450 light years (140 parsecs) away, it is located within the Taurus-Auriga Star Forming Region. The system comprises three stars orbiting each other in a hierarchical triple system, known as GG Tauri A, and another binary star system more distant from the central system, known as GG Tauri B.

The system is unusual because it contains two distinct circumstellar disks: one surrounding the entirety of GG Tauri A, and another surrounding the brightest star of GG Tauri A. Its large size and close distance make it ideal to study how exoplanets form within multiple star systems.

== Properties ==
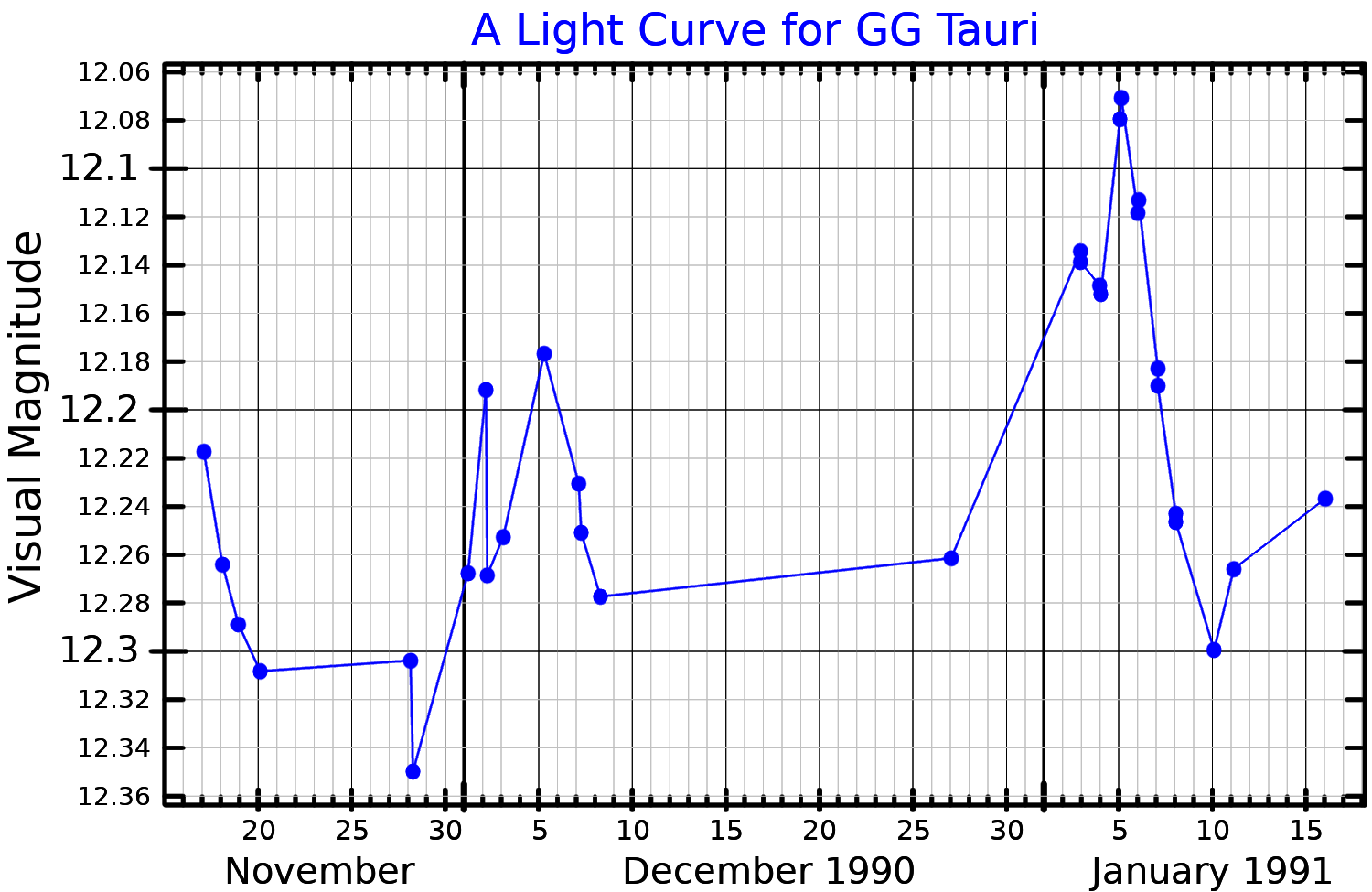
A visual band light curve for GG Tauri, adapted from Bouvier et al. (1993)

GG Tauri consists of five stars, which are T Tauri stars – a class of variable stars that show irregular changes in brightness. These stars are extremely young and more luminous than their main sequence counterparts, because they have not condensed into the normal size yet. The four components of GG Tauri stars are relatively cool K-type or M-type stars, with these spectral types: K7 for GG Tauri Aa, M0.5 for GG Tauri Ab, M5 for GG Tauri Ba, and M7 for GG Tauri Bb; the age of the system is estimated to be 1.5 million years.

A dynamical study of the system found the masses of the four components to be: 0.78 M_{☉} for GG Tauri Aa, 0.68 M_{☉} for GG Tauri Ab, 0.12 M_{☉} for GG Tauri Ba, and 0.04 M_{☉} for GG Tauri Bb. At 0.04 M_{☉}, GG Tauri Bb has a substellar mass and is a brown dwarf. Orbital motion has been detected in the central system (Aa and Ab), but not in the outer pair Ba and Bb (as its orbital period is too long).

A preliminary orbit for GG Tauri Aa and Ab has been calculated, but is not very well constrained. The orbit is moderately eccentric; Some studies have determined that their orbit has a semimajor axis of about 34 au and is misaligned to the circumbinary disk by about 25 degrees. However, other studies have found the orbit to be coplanar to the circumbinary disk, with a larger semimajor axis of about 60 au.

Interferometric techniques have been used to observe GG Tauri Ab, the lower-mass component of the central system. GG Tauri Ab was found to be a binary star system comprising two red dwarfs (Ab1 = M2V, Ab2 = M3V), with a separation of about 4.5 AU. Its orbital period is currently estimated to be around 16 years. This would explain why the GG Tauri Ab's spectrum suggests an unusually low-mass star instead of the higher mass that was measured.

Because of interactions with GG Tauri A, the outer pair GG Tauri Ba and Bb are not very stable. The internal orbit of GG Tauri Ba and Bb must be retrograde relative to its whole orbit around GG Tauri A, in order to be stable.

== Circumstellar disks ==
Artist's impression of the circumstellar disk surrounding GG Tauri A

T Tauri stars are usually surrounded by circumstellar disks of gas and dust. These disks coalesce into protoplanets and then into planets.

The subsystem GG Tauri A has a large, circumbinary (technically circumtrinary) disk. Within the disk, GG Tauri Aa also has a disk, and furthermore, at least one of the Ab stars must have a disk as well. The latter is inferred from the presence of a "gap" in the largest disk, detected at the three-o'clock position, at a position angle of about 268°. First seen in 2002, it is interpreted as a shadow because it does not rotate with the disk. Interstellar material blocks the light from part of the disk, causing this shadow. The Aa and Ab rings are coplanar to each other.

The disk around GG Tauri Aa has a mass of about 0.1 M_{☉}, or about one hundred times the mass of Jupiter, at a temperature of about 20 to 30 K. GG Tauri Aa appears to have a jet coming out from the poles, as evidenced by forbidden Fe II lines.

Mass is currently accreting from the inner disks into the stars themselves. Because the disks have not been consumed yet, the larger, circumbinary disk must be supplying mass into the smaller disks. Several lines of evidence point to this. Firstly, a search for diatomic hydrogen gas (H_{2}) could be found up to 100 AU away from the center of the system, but significant emission was also detected 30 au away. This emission was detected where a previous survey found gas streaming from the outer disk to the inner disk, so it was assumed that the emission resulted from mass falling from the inner disk to the outer disk. Observations taken in 2014 showed similar results. Secondly, near-infrared polarimetry of the area showed the same structure connecting the inner and outer disks. The stars of GG Tauri A are closer to the ring on the northern side (where the streamer is) than the southern side. Finally, although there is not much gas falling into the inner disks, the accretion rate of gas has been measured to be ~6×10^{−8} M_{☉} yr^{−1} which is at least the rate of accretion from the inner disks to the stars themselves. Therefore, the outer disk provides enough mass to replenish the inner disks.

=== Possible protoplanets ===
At the edge of the outer disk, there is a "hot spot" with additional gas, and at a higher temperature of about 40 K. There are also spiral-shaped formations within the disk. At the center of this "hot spot" may be a protoplanet termed GG Tauri Ac, which is still accreting mass. This would explain the higher gas density and temperature, as well as the spiral formations. If it exists, it would likely be about the mass of Neptune or smaller, given that it has not cleared out a gap at its location. Other planets could explain other spiral features within the disk.

=== Chemistry ===
The chemistry of circumstellar disks is important for understanding planetary formation. The inner disk, like other protoplanetary disks, is rich in simple molecules containing elements such as carbon and sulfur. In 2018, hydrogen sulfide (H_{2}S) was reported, and in 2021, thioxoethenylidene (CCS) was reported to exist within the disk. Both are the first instances of those species known in a protoplanetary disk. The chemical mechanisms related to their formation are not very well understood.

== See also ==
- HL Tauri, a T Tauri star with a protoplanetary disk
- BD−22 5866, a quadruple star system with relatively low mass
- Taurus (Chinese astronomy)
