= Nasti =

Nasti may refer to:

== People ==
- Ludovica Nasti (born 2006), Italian actress
- Marco Nasti (born 2003), Italian professional footballer
- Patrick Nasti (born 1989), Italian athlete

== Other uses ==
- Násti, a name given to the star HD 68988 in the northern constellation Ursa Major
- Nasti Muzik, 2008 album by Khia
