= Pi Arietis =

Multiple star system in the constellation Aries

π Arietis
- Location of π Arietis (circled)

Observation data Epoch J2000 Equinox ICRS
- Constellation: Aries
- Right ascension: 02^{h} 49^{m} 17.55924^{s}
- Declination: +17° 27′ 51.5168″
- Apparent magnitude (V): 5.314

Characteristics
- Spectral type: B6 V + A0 V + F8 V
- U−B color index: −0.47
- B−V color index: −0.06

Astrometry
Radial velocity (R_{v})	+8.8±0.9 km/s
Proper motion (μ)	RA: +2.60 mas/yr Dec.: −14.10 mas/yr
Parallax (π)	4.18±0.69 mas
Distance	approx. 800 ly (approx. 240 pc)
Absolute magnitude (M_{V})	−1.56

Details
Mass	4.4^{+0.55}_{−0.51} M_{☉}
Luminosity	538 L_{☉}
Surface gravity (log g)	4.5±0.25 cgs
Temperature	16,000±1,000 K
Rotational velocity (v sin i)	70 km/s
Age	13^{+9}_{−6} Myr

Other designations
- π Ari, 42 Arietis, NSV 944, BD+16°355, GC 3378, HD 17543, HIP 13165, HR 836, SAO 93127, PPM 118581

Database references
SIMBAD	data

Pi Arietis is a multiple star system in the northern constellation of Aries. Its name is a Bayer designation that is Latinized from π Arietis, and abbreviated Pi Ari or π Ari. Based upon parallax measurements made during the Hipparcos mission, this system is approximately 800 light-years (250 parsecs) distant from Earth, and has an apparent visual magnitude of 5.314. This is bright enough to be faintly seen with the naked eye. The position of this system near the ecliptic means it is subject to lunar occultation.

The primary member of this system is an intermediate-mass, B-type main sequence star with a stellar classification of B6 V. It is a close, single-lined spectroscopic binary with an orbital period of 3.854 days, an eccentricity of 0.04, and a combined visual magnitude of 5.30. At an angular separation of 3.28 arcseconds is a magnitude 8.46 A-type main sequence star with a classification of A0 Vp. Finally, a fourth member of the system is a magnitude 11.0 F-type main sequence star with a classification of F8V at an angular separation of 25.2 arcseconds from the primary.

== Name ==
This star, along with δ Ari, ε Ari, ζ Ari, and ρ^{3} Ari, were Al Bīrūnī's Al Buṭain (ألبطين), the dual of Al Baṭn, the Belly. According to the catalogue of stars in the Technical Memorandum 33-507 - A Reduced Star Catalog Containing 537 Named Stars, Al Buṭain were the title for five stars : δ Ari as Botein, π Ari as Al Buṭain I, ρ^{3} Ari as Al Buṭain II, ε Ari as Al Buṭain III dan ζ Ari as Al Buṭain IV.

In Chinese, 左更 (Zuǒ Gēng), meaning Official in Charge of the Forest, refers to an asterism consisting of π Arietis, ν Arietis, μ Arietis, ο Arietis and σ Arietis. Consequently, the Chinese name for π Arietis itself is 左更五 (Zuǒ Gēng wu, English: the Fifth Star of Official in Charge of the Forest.)
