= Epsilon Arietis =

Binary star system in the constellation Aries

ε Arietis
- Location of ε Arietis (circled)

Observation data Epoch J2000 Equinox J2000
- Constellation: Aries
- Right ascension: 02^{h} 59^{m} 12.726^{s}
- Declination: +21° 20′ 25.54″
- Apparent magnitude (V): 4.63 (5.2/5.5)

Characteristics
- Spectral type: A2 Vs + A2 Vs
- U−B color index: +0.08
- B−V color index: +0.04
- R−I color index: 0.02

Astrometry
Radial velocity (R_{v})	+0.9±0.9 km/s
Proper motion (μ)	RA: −15.884 mas/yr Dec.: −7.151 mas/yr
Parallax (π)	9.0296±0.1851 mas
Distance	361 ± 7 ly (111 ± 2 pc)

Orbit
Period (P)	704.111±1.778 yr
Semi-major axis (a)	2.174±0.035″
Eccentricity (e)	0.317±0.006
Inclination (i)	84.2±0.8°
Longitude of the node (Ω)	25.6±0.7°
Periastron epoch (T)	704.111±1.778
Argument of periastron (ω) (secondary)	162.1±1.0°

Details

ε Ari A
Mass	2.4 M_{☉}
Rotational velocity (v sin i)	60 km/s

ε Ari B
Mass	2.4 M_{☉}
Rotational velocity (v sin i)	60 km/s

Other designations
- 48 Arietis, BD+20 484, HIP 13914, ADS 2257, WDS J02592+2120AB
- ε Ari A: GC 3582, HD 18520, HR 888, SAO 75673, PPM 92122
- ε Ari B: HD 18519, HR 887

Database references
SIMBAD	ε Ari
- ε Ari A
- ε Ari B

Epsilon Arietis is a visual binary star system in the northern constellation of Aries. Its name is a Bayer designation that is Latinized from ε Arietis, and abbreviated Epsilon Ari or ε Ari. This system has a combined apparent visual magnitude of 4.63 and can be seen with the naked eye, although the two components are too close together to be resolved without a telescope. With an annual parallax shift of 9.03 mas, the distance to this system can be estimated as 361 light-years (111 parsecs), give or take a 7 light-year margin of error. It is located behind the dark cloud MBM12.

The brighter member of this pair has an apparent magnitude of 5.2. At an angular separation of 1.426″±0.010″ from the brighter component, along a position angle of 209.2°±0.3°, is the magnitude 5.5 companion. Both are A-type main sequence stars with a stellar classification of A2 Vs. (The 's' suffix indicates that the absorption lines in the spectrum are distinctly narrow.) In the 2009 Catalogue of Ap, HgMn and Am stars, the two stars have a classification of A3 Ti, indicating they are Ap stars with an anomalous abundance of titanium. Within the measurement margin of error, their projected rotational velocities are deemed identical at 60 km/s.

== Name ==
This star system, along with δ Ari, ζ Ari, π Ari, and ρ^{3} Ari, were Al Bīrūnī's Al Buṭain (ألبطين), the dual of Al Baṭn, the Belly. According to the catalogue of stars in the Technical Memorandum 33-507 - A Reduced Star Catalog Containing 537 Named Stars, Al Buṭain were the title for five stars :δ Ari as Botein, π Ari as Al Buṭain I, ρ^{3} Ari as Al Buṭain II, ε Ari as Al Buṭain III and ζ Ari as Al Buṭain IV

In Chinese astronomy, Epsilon Arietis may be or may be part of Tso Kang (from Cantonese 左更 zogang, Mandarin pronunciation zuǒgēng).
