= Zeta Arietis =

Star in the constellation Aries

ζ Arietis
- Location of ζ Arietis (circled)

Observation data Epoch J2000 Equinox ICRS
- Constellation: Aries
- Right ascension: 03^{h} 14^{m} 54.098^{s}
- Declination: +21° 02′ 40.01″
- Apparent magnitude (V): +4.874±0.023

Characteristics
- Evolutionary stage: main sequence
- Spectral type: A1 V
- U−B color index: −0.01
- B−V color index: −0.02

Astrometry
Radial velocity (R_{v})	+7.3±2.8 km/s
Proper motion (μ)	RA: −26.276 mas/yr Dec.: −72.900 mas/yr
Parallax (π)	12.7708±0.3734 mas
Distance	255 ± 7 ly (78 ± 2 pc)
Absolute magnitude (M_{V})	+0.35

Details
Mass	2.430±0.340 M_{☉}
Radius	2.974±0.115 R_{☉}
Luminosity	65.7±4.8 L_{☉}
Surface gravity (log g)	3.88±0.07 cgs
Temperature	9,528±117 K
Rotational velocity (v sin i)	133 km/s
Age	333 Myr

Other designations
- ζ Ari, 58 Arietis, BD+20 527, FK5 1089, GC 3872, HD 20150, HIP 15110, HR 972, SAO 75810, PPM 92319

Database references
SIMBAD	data

Zeta Arietis is a star in the northern constellation of Aries. Its name is a Bayer designation that is Latinized from ζ Arietis, and abbreviated Zeta Ari or ζ Ari. This star is dimly visible to the naked eye with an apparent visual magnitude of +4.87. Based upon an annual parallax shift of 12.77 mas, the distance to this star is approximately 255 light-years (78 parsecs). It is receding from the Sun with a radial velocity of +7 km/s.

This is an A-type main sequence star with a stellar classification of A1 V. It is an estimated 333 million years old and is spinning rapidly with a projected rotational velocity of 133 km/s. Zeta Arietis has 2.4 times the mass of the Sun and 3.0 times the Sun's radius. It is radiating 66 times the luminosity of the Sun from its photosphere at an effective temperature of 9,528 K, giving it the characteristic white-hued glow of an A-type star.

== Name ==
This star, along with δ Ari, ε Ari, π Ari, and ρ^{3} Ari, were Al Bīrūnī's Al Buṭain (ألبطين), the dual of Al Baṭn, the Belly. According to the catalogue of stars in the Technical Memorandum 33-507 - A Reduced Star Catalog Containing 537 Named Stars, Al Buṭain was the title for five stars: δ Ari as Botein, π Ari as Al Buṭain I, ρ^{3} Ari as Al Buṭain II, ε Ari as Al Buṭain III, and ζ Ari as Al Buṭain IV.

In Chinese, 天陰 (Tiān Yīn), meaning Yin Force, refers to an asterism consisting of ζ Arietis, 63 Arietis, δ Arietis, τ Arietis and 65 Arietis. Consequently, the Chinese name for ζ Arietis itself is 天陰二 (Lóu Su èr, English: the Second Star of Yin Force.)
