= G 29-38 =

White dwarf in Pisces

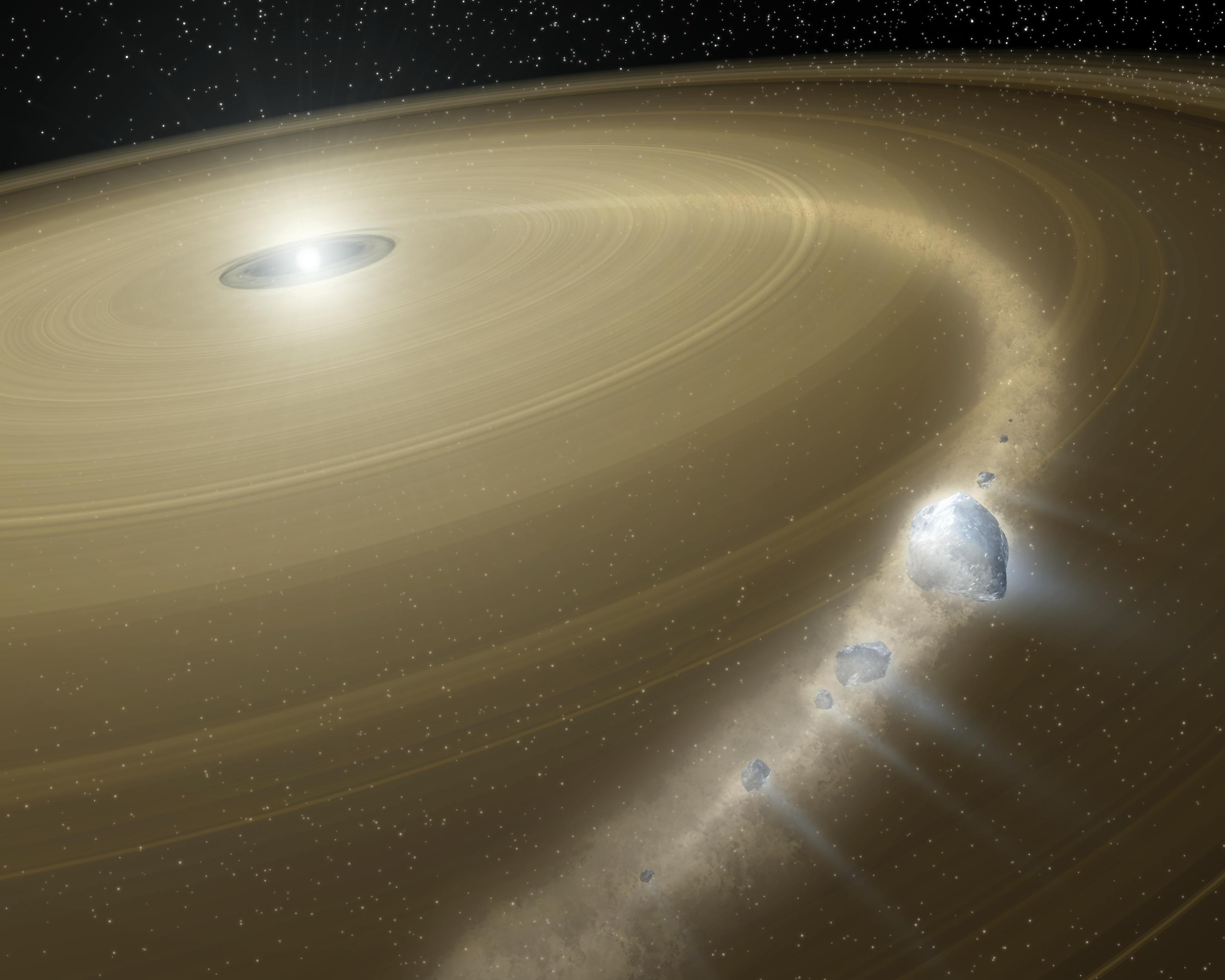
- Artist's impression of G29-38 and its debris disk

Observation data Epoch J2000.0 Equinox ICRS
- Constellation: Pisces
- Right ascension: 23^{h} 28^{m} 47.6365^{s}
- Declination: +05° 14′ 54.235″
- Apparent magnitude (V): 13.0

Characteristics
- Evolutionary stage: white dwarf
- Spectral type: DAV4.1
- Variable type: ZZ Cet

Astrometry
Radial velocity (R_{v})	15.3±3.0 km/s
Proper motion (μ)	RA: −398.246(32) mas/yr Dec.: −266.744(20) mas/yr
Parallax (π)	57.0620±0.0251 mas
Distance	57.16 ± 0.03 ly (17.525 ± 0.008 pc)

Details
Mass	0.632±0.030 M_{☉}
Radius	0.0124 R_{☉}
Luminosity	0.00255 L_{☉}
Surface gravity (log g)	8.048±0.005 cgs
Temperature	11,635±178 K

Other designations
- ZZ Piscium, EGGR 159, GJ 895.2, LHS 5405, LTT 16907, NLTT 56992, WD 2326+049.

Database references
SIMBAD	data

Giclas 29-38 is a white dwarf in the constellation Pisces. A variable star, it bears the variable-star designation ZZ Piscium, and makes part of the DAV (or ZZ Ceti) variable type. Such stars display variability due to large-amplitude, non-radial pulsations known as gravity waves.

== Variability ==
G 29-38 was first reported to be variable by Shulov and Kopatskaya in 1974. DAV stars are like normal white dwarfs but have luminosity variations with amplitudes as high as 30%, arising from a superposition of vibrational modes with periods from 100 to 1,000 seconds. Large-amplitude DAVs generally differ from lower-amplitude DAVs by having lower temperatures, longer primary periodicities, and many peaks in their vibrational spectra with frequencies which are sums of other vibrational modes.

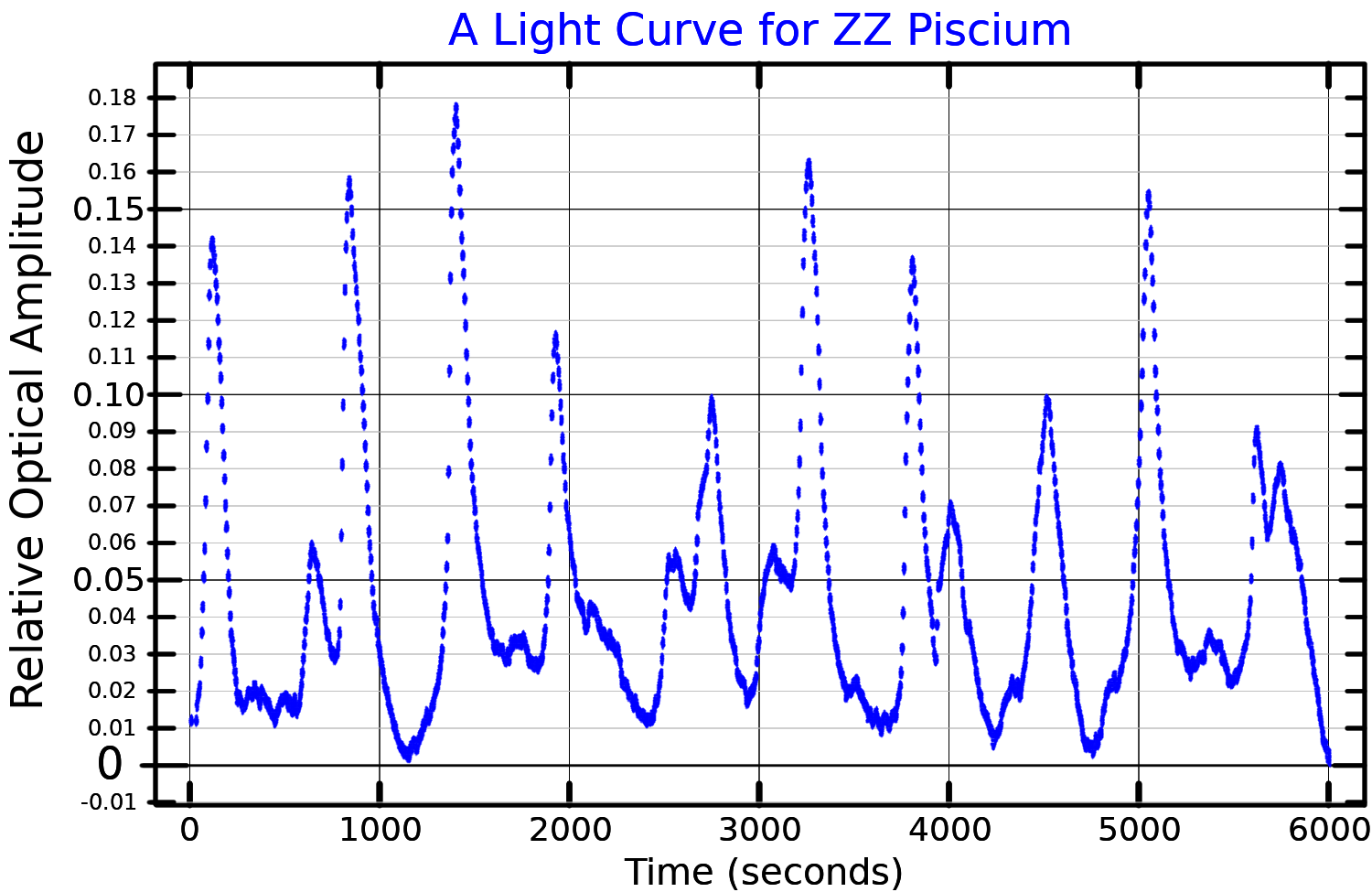
A light curve for ZZ Piscium, adapted from Fontaine and Brassard (2008)

G29-38, like other complex, large-amplitude DAV variables, has proven difficult to understand. The power spectrum or periodogram of the light curve varies over times which range from weeks to years. Usually, one strong mode dominates, although many smaller-amplitude modes are often observed. The larger-amplitude modes, however, fluctuate in and out of observability; some low-power areas show more stability. Asteroseismology uses the observed spectrum of pulsations from stars like G29-38 to infer the structure of their interiors.

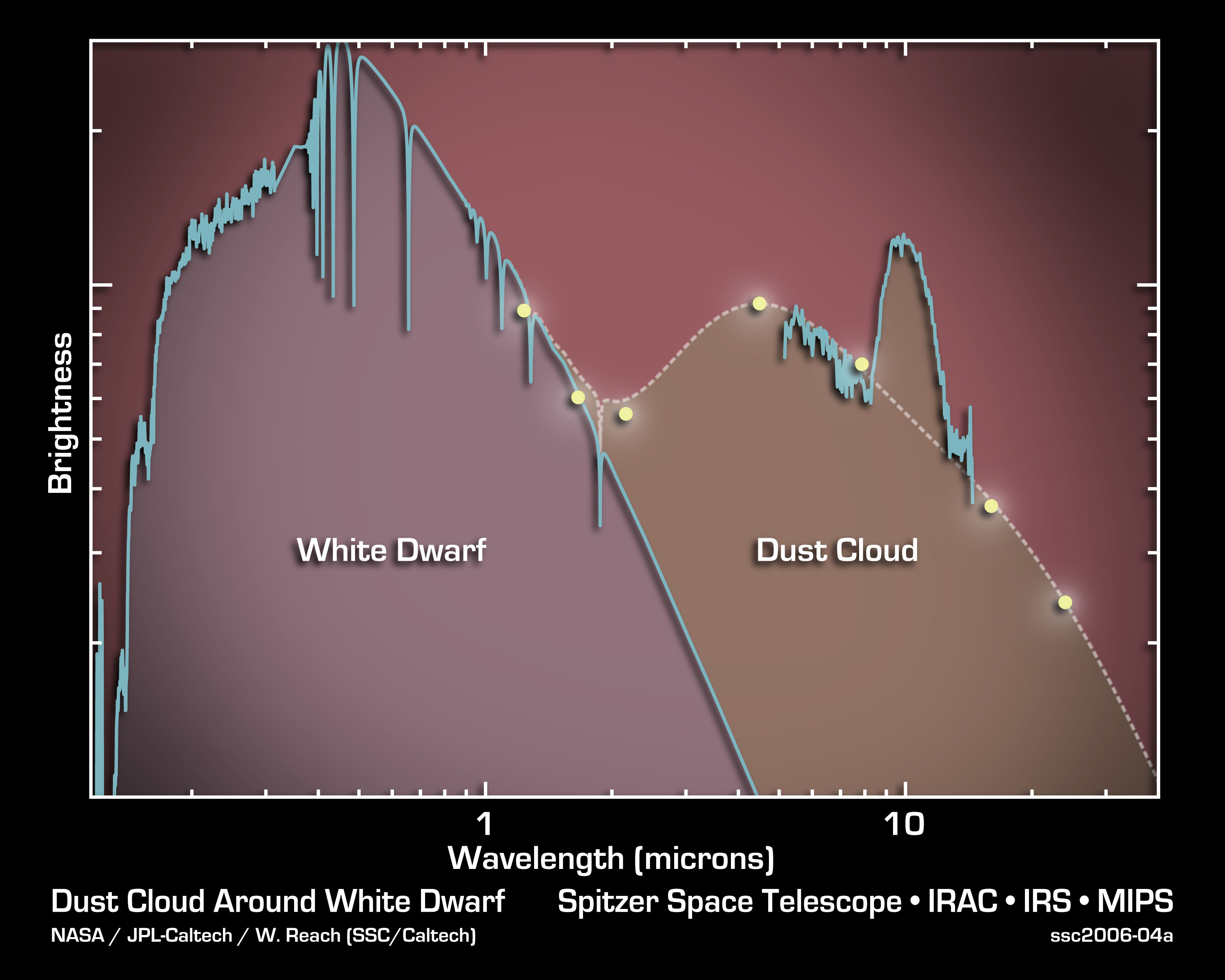
The spectrum of G29-38

== Debris disk ==
The circumstellar environment of G29-38 first attracted attention in the late 1980s during a near-infrared survey of 200 white dwarfs conducted by Ben Zuckerman and Eric Becklin to search for low mass companion stars and brown dwarfs. G29-38 was shown to radiate substantial emission between 2 and 5 micrometres, far in excess of that expected from extrapolation of the visual and near infrared spectrum of the star. Like other young, hot white dwarfs, G29-38 is thought to have formed relatively recently (600 million years ago) from its AGB progenitor, and therefore the excess was naturally explained by emission from a Jupiter-like brown dwarf with a temperature of 1,200 K and a radius of 0.15 solar radius. However, later observations, including speckle interferometry, failed to detect a brown dwarf.

Infrared observations made in 2004 by NASA's Spitzer Space Telescope indicated the presence of a dust cloud around G29-38, which may have been created by tidal disruption of an exocomet or exoasteroid passing close to the white dwarf. This may mean that G29-38 is still orbited by a ring of surviving comets and, possibly, outer planets. This is the first observation supporting the idea that comets persist to the white dwarf stage of stellar evolution.

Infrared emission at 9–11 microns from Spitzer spectroscopy were interpreted as a mixture of amorphous olivine and a small amount of fosterite in the disk. Modelling of the disk have shown that the inner edge of the disk lies at around 96±4 white dwarf radii and that the disk has a width of about 1–10 white dwarf radii. The dust mass of the disk is about 4–5 × 10^{18} g (about half the mass of a massive asteroid) and the disk has a temperature less than 1000 K.

The white dwarf is detected in x-rays with Chandra and XMM-Newton. This is seen as evidence for accretion from the disk and while the count number is small, there is evidence that this x-ray emission could come from iron.

== See also ==
- List of exoplanets and planetary debris around white dwarfs
- GD 362, second white dwarf with a disk discovered
