= Rho3 Arietis =

Binary star system in the constellation Aries

Rho^{3} Arietis
Observation data Epoch J2000.0 Equinox J2000.0 (ICRS)
- Constellation: Aries
- Right ascension: 02^{h} 56^{m} 26.1717^{s}
- Declination: +18° 01′ 23.665″
- Apparent magnitude (V): 5.58

Characteristics
- Spectral type: F6 V
- U−B color index: −0.02
- B−V color index: +0.471±0.003
- V−R color index: 0.3
- R−I color index: 0.2

Astrometry
Radial velocity (R_{v})	+13.576±0.0016 km/s
Proper motion (μ)	RA: +262.027 mas/yr Dec.: −231.606 mas/yr
Parallax (π)	27.2557±0.1350 mas
Distance	119.7 ± 0.6 ly (36.7 ± 0.2 pc)
Absolute magnitude (M_{V})	2.89

Details
Mass	1.49 M_{☉}
Luminosity	6.65 L_{☉}
Surface gravity (log g)	4.19 cgs
Temperature	6,380 K
Metallicity [Fe/H]	−0.23±0.10 dex
Rotational velocity (v sin i)	15 km/s
Age	2.4 Gyr

Other designations
- ρ^{3} Ari, Rho^{3} Arietis, Rho^{3} Ari, 46 Arietis, 46 Ari, BD+17 458, FK5 2204, GC 3532, HD 18256, HIP 13702, HR 869, SAO 93195, PPM 118684, LTT 10961, NLTT 9363

Database references
SIMBAD	data

Rho^{3} Arietis is a star in the northern constellation of Aries. Its name is a Bayer designation that is Latinized from ρ^{3} Arietis, and abbreviated Rho^{3} Ari or ρ^{3} Ari. This star is faintly visible to the naked eye with an apparent visual magnitude of 5.63. Based upon an annual parallax shift of 27.26 mas, this star is located at a distance of 120 light-years (37 parsecs) from Earth. It is drifting further away from the Sun with a radial velocity of +13.6 km/s.

This is an astrometric binary system. The visible component is an F-type main sequence star with a stellar classification of F6 V. This star has 1.49 times the mass of the Sun and is radiating 6.65 times the Sun's luminosity at an effective temperature of 6,380 K. It is around 2.4 billion years old and has a lower abundance of elements other than hydrogen and helium when compared to the Sun.

== Name ==
This star, along with δ Ari, ε Ari, ζ Ari, and π Ari, were Al Bīrūnī's Al Buṭain (ألبطين), the dual of Al Baṭn, the Belly. According to the catalogue of stars in the Technical Memorandum 33-507 - A Reduced Star Catalog Containing 537 Named Stars, Al Buṭain were the title for five stars : δ Ari as Botein, π Ari as Al Buṭain I, ρ^{3} Ari as Al Buṭain II, ε Ari as Al Buṭain III dan ζ Ari as Al Buṭain IV.
