= GD 362 =

Star in the constellation Hercules

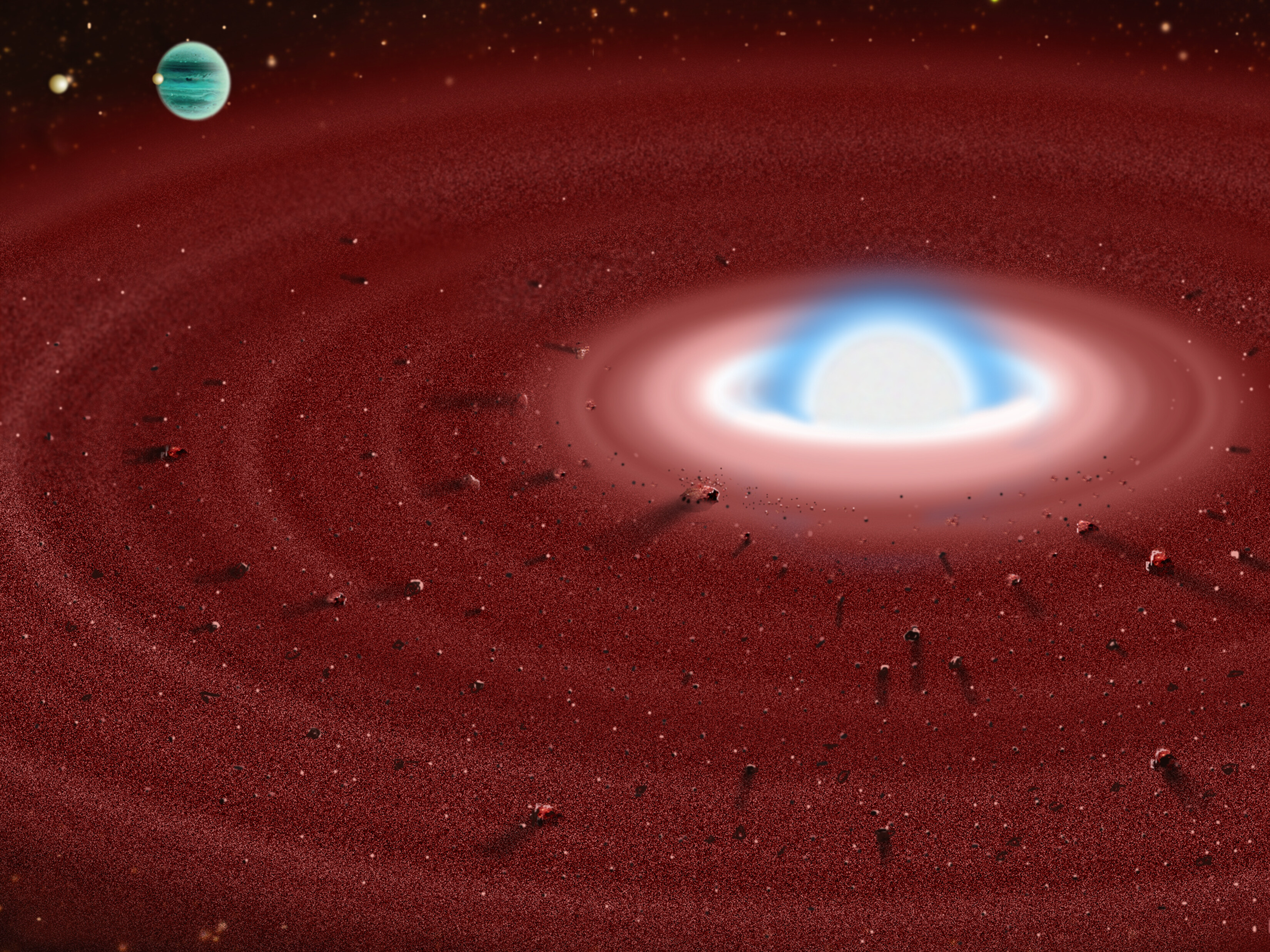
- Artist's impression of the disk around G 362; Credit: Gemini Observatory/NSF/AURA/J. Lomberg

Observation data Epoch J2000.0 (ICRS) Equinox ICRS
- Constellation: Hercules
- Right ascension: 17^{h} 31^{m} 34.317^{s}
- Declination: +37° 05′ 20.71″
- Apparent magnitude (V): 16.23

Characteristics
- Spectral type: DAZB
- B−V color index: 0.2

Astrometry
Proper motion (μ)	RA: +24.010 mas/yr Dec.: -216.977 mas/yr
Parallax (π)	17.8145±0.0332 mas
Distance	183.1 ± 0.3 ly (56.1 ± 0.1 pc)

Details
Mass	0.574±0.007 M_{☉}
Radius	0.0126 R_{☉}
Radius	8790±180 km
Luminosity	0.0016 L_{☉}
Surface gravity (log g)	7.99±0.01 cgs
Temperature	9,825±59 K

Other designations
- EGGR 545, G 204-14, NLTT 44986, WD 1729+371, 2MASS J17313433+3705209, PG 1729+371

Database references
SIMBAD	data

GD 362 is a white dwarf approximately 183 light-years from Earth. In 2004, spectroscopic observations showed that it had a relatively high concentration of metals in its atmosphere. Since the high gravitational field of white dwarfs quickly forces heavy elements to settle towards the bottom of the atmosphere, this meant that the atmosphere was being polluted by an external source. In 2005, infrared photometric observations suggested that it was surrounded by a ring of dust with size comparable to the rings of Saturn, providing an explanation for this pollution.

In 2006, Benjamin Zuckerman, Michael Jura and other astronomers used the Keck telescope to obtain high-resolution spectra of GD 362 which showed that heavy elements in the star's atmosphere occurred in concentrations similar to those in the Earth-Moon system. The group concluded that a possible origin for GD 362's dust ring and atmospheric pollutants was that a rocky asteroid about 200 km in diameter was disintegrated by tidal effects between 100,000 and 1 million years ago. If this was the origin, the spectra indicate that the asteroid should have had composition similar to the Earth's crust, suggesting that the star might have had an Earth-like planet before it entered its red giant phase.

GD 362 has an exceptionally strong infrared excess. 2.4% of the star light is re-processed into the mid-infrared. Optical spectroscopy can only probe material that did already fall into the atmosphere. Infrared spectroscopy can however directly probe the material of the disk. James Webb Space Telescope spectroscopy did find strong silicate emission between 9 and 11 μm. This feature can be explained by a combination of olivine and pyroxene silicate minerals. Dust modelling showed that the minerals ferrosilite (28.3%), amorphous olivine (24.1%) and forsterite (12.6%) have the highest mass fraction. Additionally the emission in the near-infrared requires grains such as carbon. The carbon and silicates reside inside a disk located within 140 to 1400 stellar radii from the white dwarf and the disk has a scale height greater than half the stellar radius. This is just outside the Roche limit and requires hot debris with a temperature of 950 K (677 °C; 1,250 °F) close to the star. The element abundance matches with the abundance from optical spectroscopy, except for hydrogen. The elemental abundance of the disk also matches that of CI chondrites, with aluminium elevated and oxygen slightly depleted. The mineral composition is however different to CI chondrites, as the disk does not contain any phyllosilicates.

In 2009 it was discovered that this white dwarf has an anomalous high hydrogen content. This could come from the accretion of a water-rich body with a mass between Callisto and Mars. The origin of the high amount of hydrogen is however still up for debate. JWST spectroscopy did probe the material of the disk and found it to be very dry. No H-bearing minerals and no water is detected inside the disk. The large amount of hydrogen in the atmosphere could be explained by a past accretion of an ice-rich body, different to the body that formed the disk currently present.

JWST imaging exclude stars or brown dwarfs with masses greater than 25 M_{J} as companions.

GD 362 has been a white dwarf for approximately 900 million years.

== See also ==
- List of exoplanets and planetary debris around white dwarfs
- G 29-38 was the first white dwarf for which a disk was discovered
