= HD 68988 b =

Hot Jupiter in the constellation Ursa Major

HD 68988 b / Albmi
Discovery
- Discovered by: Vogt et al.
- Discovery site: Keck Observatory
- Discovery date: 15 October 2001
- Detection method: Radial velocity

Orbital characteristics
- Apastron: 0.0809 AU (12,100,000 km)
- Periastron: 0.0599 AU (8,960,000 km)
- Semi-major axis: 0.0704 AU (10,530,000 km)
- Eccentricity: 0.1497 ± 0.0079
- Orbital period (sidereal): 6.27670 ± 0.000053 d 0.0171844 y
- Average orbital speed: 122
- Time of periastron: 2451549.062 ± 0.040
- Argument of periastron: 40 ± 170
- Semi-amplitude: 191.6 ± 1.7
- Star: HD 68988

HD 68988 b is a hot jupiter located approximately 192 light-years away in the constellation of Ursa Major, orbiting the star HD 68988 in a moderately eccentric orbit.

The planet HD 68988 b is called Albmi. The name was selected in the NameExoWorlds campaign by Norway, during the 100th anniversary of the IAU. Albmi means sky in the Northern Sami language.

== See also ==
- HD 68988 c
