= Iota Apodis =

Star in the constellation Apus

ι Apodis
- Location of ι Apodis (circled)

Observation data Epoch J2000 Equinox ICRS
- Constellation: Apus
- Right ascension: 17^{h} 22^{m} 05.876^{s}
- Declination: −70° 07′ 23.54″
- Apparent magnitude (V): 5.41 (5.90/6.46)

Characteristics
- Spectral type: B9 V + B9.5 V
- U−B color index: −0.23
- B−V color index: −0.04

Astrometry
Radial velocity (R_{v})	−4.3 km/s
Proper motion (μ)	RA: −1.881 mas/yr Dec.: −11.363 mas/yr
Parallax (π)	3.1948±0.1853 mas
Distance	1,020 ± 60 ly (310 ± 20 pc)

Orbit
Period (P)	59.32±3.0 yr
Semi-major axis (a)	0.115±0.005″
Eccentricity (e)	0.172±0.050
Inclination (i)	69.4±3.0°
Longitude of the node (Ω)	119.6±4.0°
Argument of periastron (ω) (secondary)	270.5±7.0°

Details

ι Aps A
Mass	3.89±1.02 M_{☉}

ι Aps B
Mass	3.45±0.90 M_{☉}

Other designations
- ι Apodis, Iot Aps, ι Aps, CPD−69 2719, FK5 642, HD 156190, HIP 84979, HR 6411, SAO 257491, WDS J17221−7007

Database references
SIMBAD	data

Iota Apodis is a binary star system in the southern circumpolar constellation of Apus. Its identifier is a Bayer designation that is Latinized from ι Apodis, and abbreviated Iot Aps or ι Aps, respectively. This system is a faint target at an apparent visual magnitude of 5.41, but still visible to the naked eye from suitably dark skies. The distance to this star can be gauged from parallax measurements, yielding an estimate of 1,020 light-years (310 parsecs) with a 6% margin of error. The system is drifting closer with a heliocentric radial velocity of −4.3 km/s.

The dual nature of this system was announced by W. S. Finsen in 1960, who reported an angular separation of 0.104 arcseconds. Their orbit has an angular separation of 0.091 arcseconds with an estimated orbital period of 59.32 years and an eccentricity (ovalness) of 0.17. Both stars are B-type main sequence stars, which indicates they shine with a blue-white hue. The brighter component has a stellar classification of B9 V and an apparent magnitude 5.90, while the second member is a B9.5 V star with a magnitude of 6.46. They are about 3.89 and 3.45 times as massive as the Sun, respectively.

== Naming ==
In Chinese caused by adaptation of the European southern hemisphere constellations into the Chinese system, 異雀 (Yì Què), meaning Exotic Bird, refers to an asterism consisting of ι Apodis, ζ Apodis, β Apodis, γ Apodis, δ Octantis, δ^{1} Apodis, η Apodis, α Apodis and ε Apodis. Consequently, ι Apodis itself is known as 異雀二 (Yì Què èr, English: the Second Star of Exotic Bird.)
