= HD 156411 =

Star in the constellation Ara

HD 156411 / Inquill
Observation data Epoch J2000.0 Equinox ICRS
- Constellation: Ara
- Right ascension: 17^{h} 19^{m} 51.40072^{s}
- Declination: −48° 32′ 57.5600″
- Apparent magnitude (V): 6.67

Characteristics
- Evolutionary stage: subgiant
- Spectral type: G1V(w)
- Apparent magnitude (B): 7.284
- Apparent magnitude (J): 5.563±0.018
- Apparent magnitude (H): 5.241±0.031
- Apparent magnitude (K): 5.170±0.021
- B−V color index: 0.614±0.008

Astrometry
Radial velocity (R_{v})	−38.84±0.12 km/s
Proper motion (μ)	RA: −33.443 mas/yr Dec.: −211.177 mas/yr
Parallax (π)	17.9656±0.0212 mas
Distance	181.5 ± 0.2 ly (55.66 ± 0.07 pc)
Absolute magnitude (M_{V})	2.976

Details
Mass	1.24±0.03 M_{☉}
Radius	2.15±0.11 R_{☉}
Luminosity	5.38 L_{☉}
Surface gravity (log g)	4.03±0.03 cgs
Temperature	5,908±16 K
Metallicity [Fe/H]	−0.12±0.02 dex
Rotation	27.15 days
Rotational velocity (v sin i)	1.84±0.23 km/s
Age	4.28±0.42 Gyr

Other designations
- Inquill, CD−48°11605, HD 156411, HIP 84787, SAO 227825, PPM 322823, NLTT 44550

Database references
SIMBAD	data
Exoplanet Archive	data

HD 156411 is a 7th magnitude G-type subgiant star located approximately 182 light-years away in the southern constellation Ara. This star is larger, hotter, brighter, and more massive than the Sun. Its metal content is three-fourths as much as the Sun. The star is around 4.3 billion years old and is spinning with a projected rotational velocity of 1.8 km/s. Naef and associates (2010) noted the star appears to be slightly evolved. In 2009, a gas giant planet was found in orbit around the star.

The star HD 156411 is named Inquill. The name was selected in the NameExoWorlds campaign by Peru, during the 100th anniversary of the IAU. Inquil was one half of the couple involved in the tragic love story Way to the Sun by Abraham Valdelomar.

The HD 156411 planetary system
Companion (in order from star)	Mass	Semimajor axis (AU)	Orbital period (days)	Eccentricity	Inclination (°)	Radius
b / Sumajmajta	≥ 0.74+0.05 −0.04 M_{J}	1.88+0.03 −0.04	842.2±14.5	0.22±0.08	—	—
