= HD 199942 =

Binary star system in the constellation Equuleus

Observation data Epoch J2000.0 Equinox ICRS
- Constellation: Equuleus
- Right ascension: 21^{h} 00^{m} 03.99267^{s}
- Declination: +07° 30′ 58.3018″
- Apparent magnitude (V): 5.98 (6.23 + 8.13)

Characteristics
- Evolutionary stage: Main sequence
- Spectral type: F1Vp or F1VgF1mA8
- B−V color index: 0.283±0.006

Astrometry
Radial velocity (R_{v})	−26.2 km/s
Proper motion (μ)	RA: +40.810 mas/yr Dec.: +30.445 mas/yr
Parallax (π)	17.7360±0.4820 mas
Distance	184 ± 5 ly (56 ± 2 pc)
Absolute magnitude (M_{V})	+1.59

Orbit
Period (P)	58.40 yr
Semi-major axis (a)	0.295″
Eccentricity (e)	0.295
Inclination (i)	130.8°
Longitude of the node (Ω)	192.0°
Periastron epoch (T)	1959.09
Argument of periastron (ω) (secondary)	318.1°

Details

A
Mass	1.65 M_{☉}
Radius	1.97+0.07 −0.09 R_{☉}
Luminosity	10.2±0.3 L_{☉}
Surface gravity (log g)	3.94 cgs
Temperature	7342+181 −115 K
Rotational velocity (v sin i)	159 km/s
Age	1.016 Gyr

Other designations
- 5 G. Equulei, KUI 102, BD+06°4718, HD 199942, HIP 103652, HR 8038, SAO 126447, WDS J21001+0731AB

Database references
SIMBAD	data

HD 199942 is a binary star system in the northern constellation of Equuleus. It is faintly visible to the naked eye with an apparent visual magnitude of 5.98. The system is located at a distance of approximately 184 light years based on parallax, and it has an absolute magnitude of 1.59. It is drifting closer with a radial velocity of −26 km/s.

This system is moving through the galaxy at a velocity of 30.3 km/s relative to the Sun. Its galactic orbit carry it somewhere between 25100-22000 light years from the galactic core, and it will come at its closest to the Sun 2.1 million years from now, at a distance of 124.0 light-years.

The binary nature of this system was discovered in 1934 by G. P. Kuiper, who found the pair had an angular separation of 0.3″. The pair orbit each other with a period of 58.4 years and an eccentricity of 0.295. The primary component is of visual magnitude 6.23 and is a chemically-peculiar F-type main-sequence star with a class of F1Vp. The companion is of magnitude 8.13.
