= Delta Arietis =

Star in the constellation Aries

δ Arietis
- Location of δ Arietis (circled)

Observation data Epoch J2000 Equinox ICRS
- Constellation: Aries
- Right ascension: 03^{h} 11^{m} 37.767^{s}
- Declination: +19° 43′ 36.02″
- Apparent magnitude (V): 4.349

Characteristics
- Evolutionary stage: red giant branch
- Spectral type: K2 III
- U−B color index: +0.914
- B−V color index: +1.035
- R−I color index: 0.51
- Variable type: Suspected

Astrometry
| Radial velocity (R_{v}) | +23.05±0.20 km/s |
| Proper motion (μ) | RA: +153.871 mas/yr Dec.: –5.586 mas/yr |
| Parallax (π) | 19.7731±0.1592 mas |
| Distance | 165 ± 1 ly (50.6 ± 0.4 pc) |
| Absolute magnitude (M_{V}) | +0.77 |

Details
| Mass | 1.89±0.18 M_{☉} |
| Radius | 10.095±0.165 R_{☉} |
| Luminosity | 52.7±1.6 L_{☉} |
| Surface gravity (log g) | 2.885±0.220 cgs |
| Temperature | 4,782±52 K |
| Metallicity [Fe/H] | −0.096±0.050 dex |
| Rotational velocity (v sin i) | 4.3 km/s |
| Age | 1.3±0.4 Gyr |

Other designations
- Botein, Botejn, δ Arietis, 57 Arietis, BD+19°477, FK5 114, GC 3805, HD 19787, HIP 14838, HR 951, SAO 93328, PPM 118897

Database references
| SIMBAD | data |

Delta Arietis is a star in the northern constellation of Aries, positioned 1.8 degrees north of the ecliptic. Its identifier is a Bayer designation that is Latinized from δ Arietis, and abbreviated Delta Ari or δ Ari. This star is officially named Botein, pronounced /ˈboʊtiːn/. The apparent visual magnitude of Delta Arietis is 4.35, so it is visible to the naked eye. It has an annual parallax shift of 19.77 mas; corresponding to a distance of about 165 ly (51 pc) from the Sun. This star is receding from the Sun with a radial velocity of +23 km/s.

== Nomenclature ==
δ Arietis (Latinised to Delta Arietis) is the star's Bayer designation.

It bore the traditional name Botein which is derived from Al Bīrūnī's Al Buṭayn (Arabic: البُطَين), the diminutive of Al Baṭn, "the Belly". This is the name of a star association consisting of this star, Epsilon Arietis, Zeta Arietis, Pi Arietis, and Rho^{3} Arietis According to a 1971 NASA catalogue of stars, Al Buṭain was the title for five stars: Delta Arietis (listed as Botein), Pi Arietis (as Al Buṭain I), Rho3 Arietis (Al Buṭain II), Epsilon Arietis (Al Buṭain III) and Zeta Arietis (Al Buṭain IV). In 2016, the International Astronomical Union organized a Working Group on Star Names (WGSN) to catalogue and standardize proper names for stars. The WGSN approved the name Botein for this star on 12 September 2016 and it is now so included in the List of IAU-approved Star Names.

In the catalogue of stars in the Calendarium of Al Achsasi Al Mouakket, this star was designated Nir al Botain, which was translated into Latin as Lucida Ventris, meaning "the brightest of the belly".

In Chinese, 天陰 (Tiān Yīn), meaning Yin Force, refers to an asterism consisting of Delta Arietis, 63 Arietis, Zeta Arietis, Tau Arietis and 65 Arietis. Consequently, the Chinese name for Delta Arietis itself is 天陰四 (Lóu Su sì, English: the Fourth Star of Yin Force.)

== Properties ==
Delta Arietis is an evolved giant star with a stellar classification of K2 III. It belongs to a population known as red clump giants, which means it is generating energy through the fusion of helium at its core. With 1.9 times the mass of the Sun and 1.3 billion years old, the photosphere has expanded until it is around 10.1 times the Sun's radius. The star shines with 52.7 times the Sun's luminosity at an effective temperature of 4,782 K, giving it the orange-hued glow of a K-type star. It is a suspected variable star that ranges in magnitude from 4.33 to 4.37.
