= HD 202908 =

Triple star system; Equuleus

Observation data Epoch J2000.0 Equinox J2000.0 (ICRS)
Constellation	Equuleus
- A
Right ascension	21^{h} 18^{m} 34.85^{s}
Declination	+11° 34′ 08.2″
- Apparent magnitude (V): 7.25±0.03
- B
Right ascension	21^{h} 18^{m} 34.80^{s}
Declination	+11° 34′ 08.0″
- Apparent magnitude (V): 8.87±0.14

Characteristics
- Spectral type: G0 V (combined)
- U−B color index: +0.07
- B−V color index: +0.56

Aa
- Spectral type: F9 V or G1 V

Ab
- Spectral type: G0 V or G2 V

B
- Spectral type: G1.5 V or G6 V

Astrometry
Radial velocity (R_{v})	6.24±0.04 km/s
Proper motion (μ)	RA: +29.213 mas/yr Dec.: −49.564 mas/yr
Parallax (π)	19.3447±0.0543 mas
Distance	168.6 ± 0.5 ly (51.7 ± 0.1 pc)

A
Absolute magnitude (M_{V})	+3.73±0.13

B
Absolute magnitude (M_{V})	+5.35±0.19

Orbit
Primary	A
Companion	B
Period (P)	28,685±173 d
Semi-major axis (a)	0.5177±0.0046″
Eccentricity (e)	0.8651±0.0008
Inclination (i)	100.36±0.16°
Longitude of the node (Ω)	255.03±0.17°
Periastron epoch (T)	24,468,123±3 JD
Argument of periastron (ω) (secondary)	171.9±0.3°
Semi-amplitude (K_{1}) (primary)	6.13±0.07 km/s
Semi-amplitude (K_{2}) (secondary)	13.95±0.09 km/s

Orbit
Primary	Aa
Companion	Ab
Period (P)	3.9660465±0.0000015 d
Eccentricity (e)	0.0033±0.0008
Argument of periastron (ω) (secondary)	271±13°
Semi-amplitude (K_{1}) (primary)	66.03±0.06 km/s
Semi-amplitude (K_{2}) (secondary)	69.69±0.06 km/s

Details

The System
Metallicity [Fe/H]	−0.04 dex
Age	6.4±0.7 Gyr

The A Subystem
Temperature	6,100±150 K
Rotational velocity (v sin i)	10 km/s

Aa
Mass	1.14 M_{☉}
Radius	1.06±0.08 R_{☉}
Luminosity	1.41^{+0.15}_{−0.14} L_{☉}

Ab
Mass	1.08 M_{☉}
Radius	0.97±0.08 R_{☉}
Luminosity	1.16^{+0.13}_{−0.11} L_{☉}

B
Mass	0.97 M_{☉}
Radius	0.91±0.08 R_{☉}
Luminosity	0.84^{+0.09}_{−0.08} L_{☉}
Temperature	5,703±1,090 K
Rotational velocity (v sin i)	9 km/s

Other designations
- AG+11°2644, BD+10°4514, GC 29812, HD 202908, HIP 105200, SAO 107015, ADS 14839AB, CCDM J21186+1134AB, WDS J21186+1134AB

Database references
SIMBAD	data

HD 202908, also known as HIP 105200, is a triple star located in the equatorial constellation Equuleus. It has an apparent magnitude of 7.01, making it readily visible in binoculars but not to the naked eye. When resolved, the components have apparent magnitudes of 7.25 and 8.87 respectively. The system is located relatively close at a distance of 169 light years based on Gaia DR3 parallax measurements and it is receding with a heliocentric radial velocity of 6.24 km/s.

== Stellar system ==
Aa
Period = 3.966 d
Ab
Separation = 0.5″ Period = 78 y
B

Hierarchy of orbits in the HD 202908 system

The system was first observed by astronomer S.W. Burnham.

The "A" component is a double-lined spectroscopic binary that contains two solar-type stars with spectral classifications of F9 V and G0 V respectively. The pair take roughly 4 days to orbit each other.

The tertiary companion designated "B" has a class of G1.5 V, indicating that it is an ordinary G-type main-sequence star like the Sun. HD 202908 A and B both complete an eccentric orbit every 78 years.

== Physical characteristics ==
HD 202908 Aa and Ab have masses 1.08 and 1.14 times that of the Sun and radii 97% and 106% of the Sun respectively. The former radiates 1.41 times the luminosity of the Sun from its photosphere and the latter radiates 1.16 times the Sun's luminosity. The A subsystem has an effective temperature of 6,100 K, giving it a whitish-yellow hue.

The B component has 97% the mass of the Sun and 91% of its radius. It radiates 84% of the Sun's luminosity from its photosphere at an effective temperature of 5,703 K. The system is estimated to be 6.4 billion years old.
