= Epsilon Apodis =

Star in the constellation Apus

ε Apodis
- Location of ε Apodis (circled)

Observation data Epoch J2000 Equinox ICRS
- Constellation: Apus
- Right ascension: 14^{h} 22^{m} 23.16467^{s}
- Declination: −80° 06′ 32.2053″
- Apparent magnitude (V): 5.06

Characteristics
- Spectral type: B3 V
- U−B color index: −0.610
- B−V color index: −0.121
- Variable type: γ Cas

Astrometry
Radial velocity (R_{v})	+4.5±4.2 km/s
Proper motion (μ)	RA: −9.51 mas/yr Dec.: −14.34 mas/yr
Parallax (π)	5.06±0.22 mas
Distance	640 ± 30 ly (198 ± 9 pc)
Absolute magnitude (M_{V})	−1.41

Details
Mass	6.15±0.71 M_{☉}
Radius	4.30±0.09 R_{☉}
Luminosity	1,614 L_{☉}
Surface gravity (log g)	3.50±0.04 cgs
Temperature	17,100±171 K
Metallicity [Fe/H]	−0.02 dex
Rotational velocity (v sin i)	150±3 km/s
Age	38.3±4.4 Myr

Other designations
- ε Aps, CD−79°559, HD 124771, HIP 70248, HR 5336, SAO 257142

Database references
SIMBAD	data

Epsilon Apodis is a star in the southern circumpolar constellation of Apus. Its identifier is a Bayer designation that is Latinized from ε Apodis, and abbreviated Eps Aps or ε Aps, respectively. This star has an apparent visual magnitude of 5.06, which is bright enough to be viewed from dark suburban skies. Based upon parallax measurements, it is at a distance of roughly 640 light-years (200 parsecs) from Earth. The star is drifting further away with a heliocentric radial velocity of +4.5 km/s.

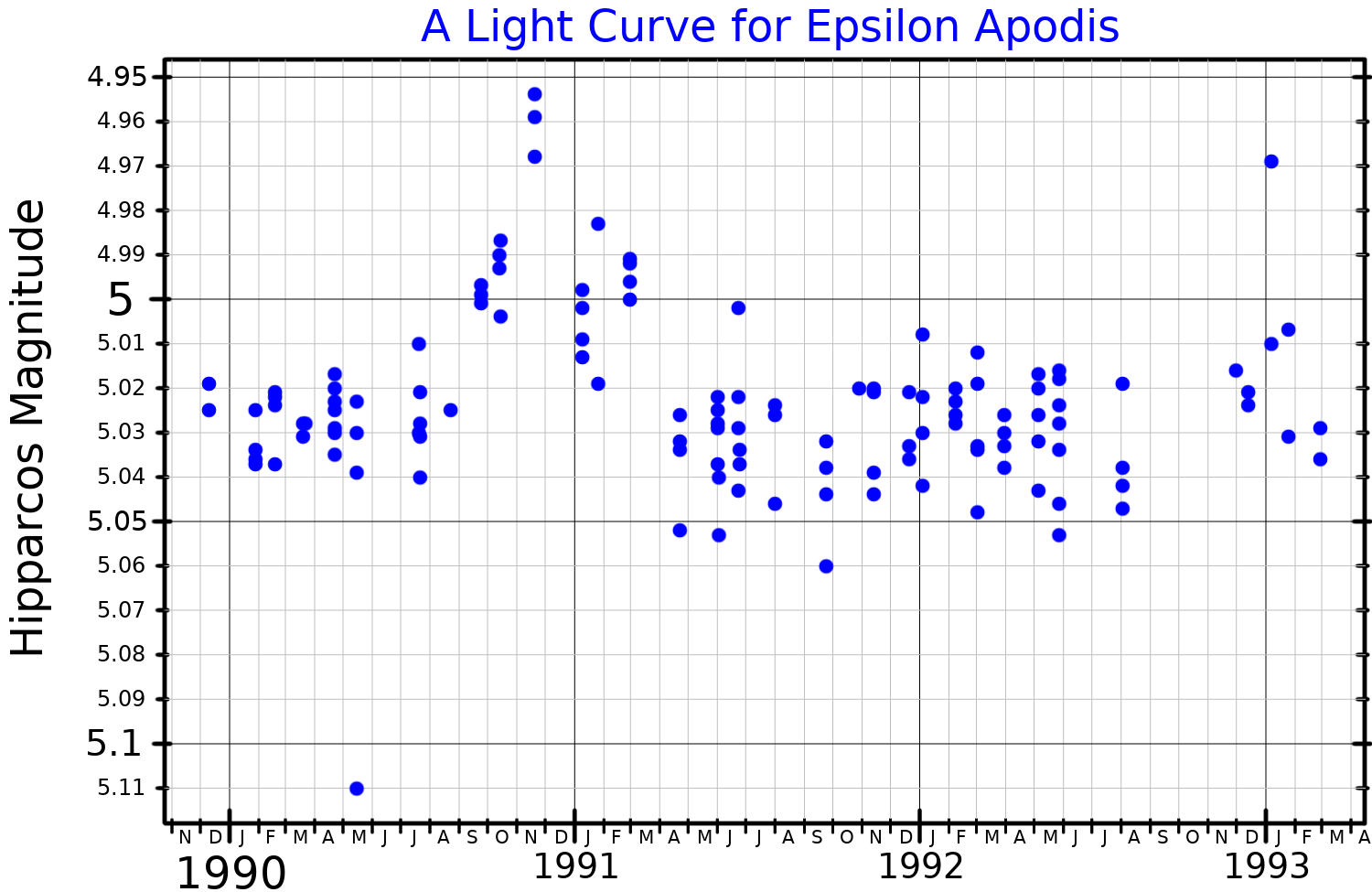
A light curve for Epsilon Apodis, plotted from Hipparcos data

Based upon a stellar classification of B3 V, this is a massive, B-type main sequence star that is generating energy through the fusion of hydrogen at its core. Epsilon Apodis has more than six times the mass of the Sun and over four times the Sun's radius. It is radiating 1,614 times as much luminosity as the Sun from its photosphere at an effective temperature of 17,100 K. At this heat, it has a blue-white glow that is a characteristic of B-type stars.

Epsilon Apodis is spinning rapidly, with a projected rotational velocity of 150 km/s giving a lower bound for the azimuthal velocity along the equator. Epsilon Apodis is classified as a Gamma Cassiopeiae type variable star and its brightness varies between magnitudes 4.99 and 5.04.

== Naming ==
In Chinese caused by adaptation of the European southern hemisphere constellations into the Chinese system, 異雀 (Yì Què), meaning Exotic Bird, refers to an asterism consisting of ε Apodis, ζ Apodis, ι Apodis, β Apodis, γ Apodis, δ Octantis, δ^{1} Apodis, η Apodis and α Apodis. Consequently, ε Apodis itself is known as 異雀九 (Yì Què jiǔ, English: the Ninth Star of Exotic Bird.)
