= HD 156411 b =

Extrasolar planet in the constellation Ara

HD 156411 b / Sumajmajta
Discovery
- Discovered by: Naef et al.
- Discovery site: La Silla Observatory
- Discovery date: October 19, 2009
- Detection method: radial velocity (HARPS)

Orbital characteristics
- Semi-major axis: 1.81 AU (271,000,000 km)
- Orbital period (sidereal): 842 d 2.31 y
- Star: HD 156411

HD 156411 b (also known as HIP 84787 b and officialled named Sumajmajta) is an extrasolar planet which orbits the G-type main sequence star HD 156411, located approximately 179 light years away in the constellation Ara. This planet has at least three-fourths the mass of Jupiter and takes about 2.6 years to orbit the star at a semimajor axis of 1.81 AU. However, unlike most other known exoplanets, its eccentricity is not known, but it is typical that its inclination is not known. This planet was detected by HARPS on October 19, 2009, together with 29 other planets.

The planet HD 156411 b is named Sumajmajta. The name was selected in the NameExoWorlds campaign by Peru, during the 100th anniversary of the IAU. Sumaj Majta was one half of the couple involved in a tragic love story Way to the Sun by Abraham Valdelomar.
