= HD 68988 c =

Exoplanet in the constellation Ursa Major

Discovery
- Discovered by: Wright et al.
- Discovery site: California, US
- Discovery date: November 2006
- Detection method: Radial velocity

Orbital characteristics
- Semi-major axis: 13.2 AU (1.97×10^{9} km)
- Eccentricity: 0.45^{+0.130}_{−0.081}
- Orbital period (sidereal): 16100^{+11000}_{−3500} d
- Average orbital speed: 14
- Time of periastron: 2452730 ± 510
- Argument of periastron: 129
- Semi-amplitude: 60 ± 11
- Star: HD 68988

Physical characteristics
- Mass: 15.0^{+2.8}_{−1.5}M_{J}

HD 68988 c is an exoplanet located approximately 192 light-years away in the constellation of Ursa Major, orbiting the star HD 68988. The parameters including period and eccentricity are highly uncertain. The semimajor axis was initially believed to be 5.32 AU with an orbital period of 4100 ± 7300 days (11 years). The planetary orbit was significantly refined in 2021.

== See also ==
- HD 68988 b
