= Delta Apodis =

Double star in the constellation Apus

δ Apodis
- Location of δ Apodis (circled)

Observation data Epoch J2000 Equinox J2000
Constellation	Apus
- δ^{1} Aps
Right ascension	16^{h} 20^{m} 20.802^{s}
Declination	−78° 41′ 44.69″
- Apparent magnitude (V): 4.66 to 4.87
- δ^{2} Aps
Right ascension	16^{h} 20^{m} 26.858^{s}
Declination	−78° 40′ 02.99″
- Apparent magnitude (V): +5.27

Characteristics

δ^{1} Aps
- Evolutionary stage: AGB
- Spectral type: M5 IIIb
- U−B color index: +1.680±0.110
- B−V color index: +1.69
- Variable type: LB?

δ^{2} Aps
- Spectral type: K3 III
- U−B color index: +1.62
- B−V color index: +1.413±0.012

Astrometry

δ^{1} Aps
Radial velocity (R_{v})	−12.0 km/s
Proper motion (μ)	RA: −9.678 mas/yr Dec.: −37.147 mas/yr
Parallax (π)	5.2508±0.1942 mas
Distance	620 ± 20 ly (190 ± 7 pc)
Absolute magnitude (M_{V})	−2.16

δ^{2} Aps
Radial velocity (R_{v})	−10.2 km/s
Proper motion (μ)	RA: −1.817 mas/yr Dec.: −31.511 mas/yr
Parallax (π)	5.795±0.0902 mas
Distance	563 ± 9 ly (173 ± 3 pc)
Absolute magnitude (M_{V})	−1.10

Details

δ^{1} Aps
Mass	2.54 M_{☉}
Radius	114 R_{☉}
Luminosity	2,593 L_{☉}
Surface gravity (log g)	1.82 cgs
Temperature	3,856 K
Metallicity [Fe/H]	−0.45 dex

δ^{2} Aps
Mass	1.14 M_{☉}
Radius	40 R_{☉}
Luminosity	44 L_{☉}
Surface gravity (log g)	1.62 cgs
Temperature	4,102 K
Metallicity [Fe/H]	−0.28 dex

Other designations
- CPD−78 1092, FK5 1424, HR 6020
- δ^{1} Aps: HD 145366, HIP 80047, SAO 257380
- δ^{2} Aps: HD 145388, HIP 80057, SAO 257381

Database references
SIMBAD	δ^{1} Aps
- δ^{2} Aps

Delta Apodis is a double star in the southern constellation of Apus. Its identifier is a Bayer designation that is Latinized from δ Apodis, and abbreviated Del Aps or δ Aps, respectively. Based on parallax measurements, the distance to δ^{1} Apodis is approximately 620 light years, while δ^{2} Apodis is found to be around 563 light years from Earth. They may form a common proper motion pair.

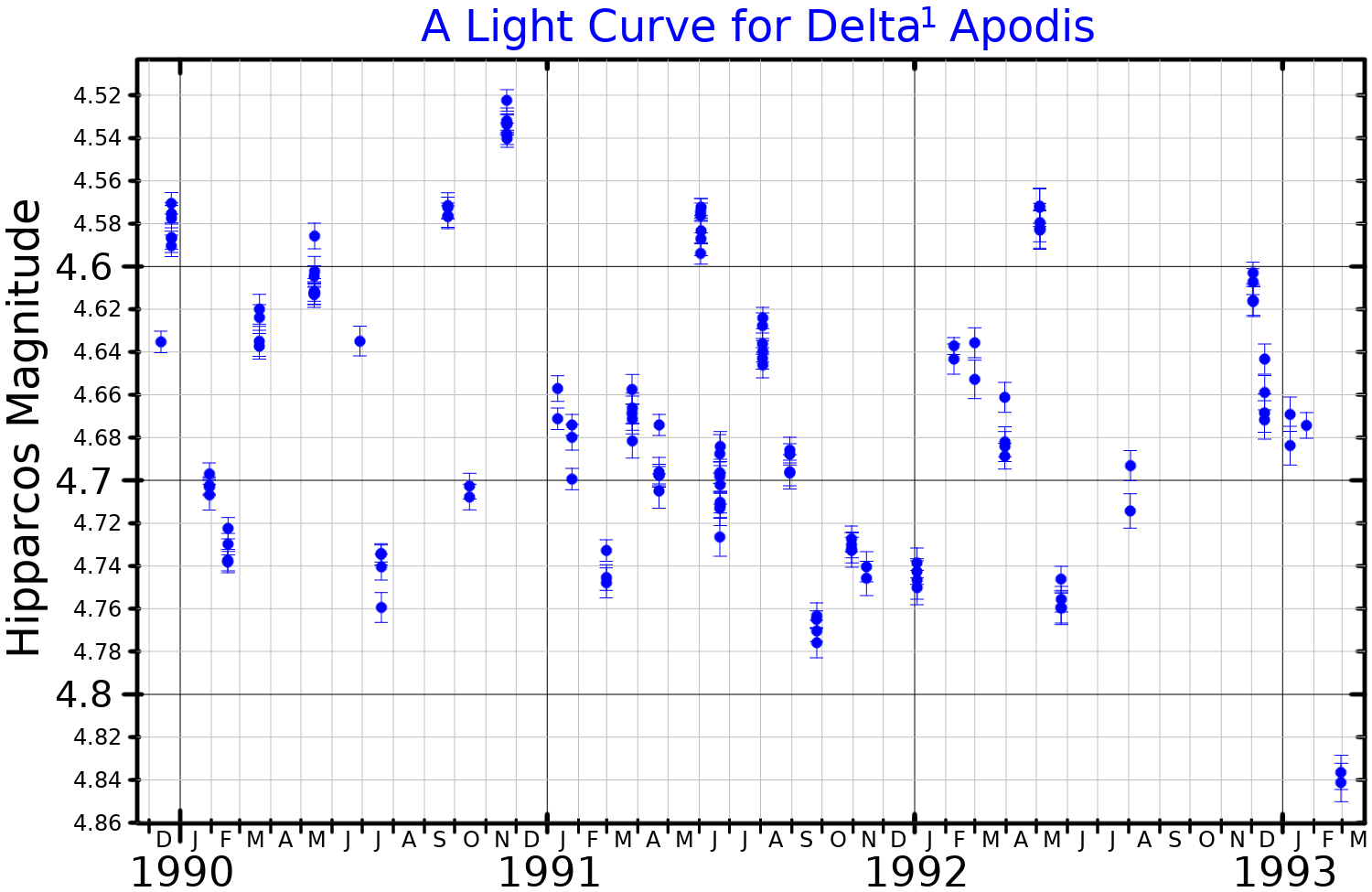
A light curve for Delta^{1} Apodis, plotted from Hipparcos data

The brighter star, δ^{1} Apodis, has an apparent magnitude that varies from +4.66 to +4.87. It is a red giant with a stellar classification of M5 IIIb, and is classified as a semiregular variable with pulsations of multiple periods of 68.0, 94.9 and 101.7 days. δ^{2} Apodis has an apparent magnitude of +5.27 and is an orange K-type giant with a class of K3 III. Both stars are bright enough to be seen with the naked eye under good observing conditions. The pair have an angular separation of 103.4 arcseconds (as of 2016), which is wide enough to allow them to be seen individually by a person with good eyesight.

== Naming ==
In Chinese caused by adaptation of the European southern hemisphere constellations into the Chinese system, 異雀 (Yì Què), meaning Exotic Bird, refers to an asterism consisting of δ^{1} Apodis, ζ Apodis, ι Apodis, β Apodis, γ Apodis, δ Octantis, η Apodis, α Apodis and ε Apodis. Consequently, δ^{1} Apodis itself is known as 異雀六 (Yì Què liù, English: the Sixth Star of Exotic Bird.)
