= Alpha Apodis =

Star in the constellation Apus

α Apodis
- Location of α Apodis (circled)

Observation data Epoch J2000 Equinox ICRS
- Constellation: Apus
- Right ascension: 14^{h} 47^{m} 51.71203^{s}
- Declination: −79° 02′ 41.1032″
- Apparent magnitude (V): 3.83

Characteristics
- Evolutionary stage: red giant branch
- Spectral type: K3IIICN0.5
- U−B color index: +1.68
- B−V color index: +1.43
- R−I color index: +0.53

Astrometry
Radial velocity (R_{v})	−1.1 km/s
Proper motion (μ)	RA: −5.133 mas/yr Dec.: −16.299 mas/yr
Parallax (π)	6.5509±0.1133 mas
Distance	498 ± 9 ly (153 ± 3 pc)
Absolute magnitude (M_{V})	−1.67

Details
Mass	4.46±0.22 M_{☉}
Radius	59.51±2.98 R_{☉} 65 ± 5 (Note: Applying the Stefan–Boltzmann law with a nominal solar effective temperature of 5,772 K: $$\sqrt{\biggl(\frac{5,772}{4,090}\biggr)^4 \cdot 10^{3.03}} = 65.19\ R_\odot$$.) R_{☉}
Luminosity	1,072±22 L_{☉}
Temperature	4,090±80 K
Metallicity [Fe/H]	−0.3 dex

Other designations
- Paradys, α Aps, Alpha Apodis, Alpha Aps, CPD−78°893, FK5 542, HD 129078, HIP 72370, HR 5470, SAO 257193

Database references
SIMBAD	data

Alpha Apodis, also named Paradys, is the brightest star in the southern circumpolar constellation of Apus. It had the Greek alpha designation as part of the constellation which Johann Bayer called Apis Indica in his 1603 Uranometria star atlas. This identifier is a Bayer designation that is Latinized from α Apodis, and abbreviated Alpha Aps or α Aps, respectively. The star has an apparent visual magnitude of approximately 3.825, which can be viewed with the naked eye. With a declination of –79°, this is a circumpolar star for much of the southern hemisphere. It can be identified on the night sky by drawing an imaginary line through Alpha Centauri and Alpha Circini then extending it toward the south celestial pole.

This is a giant star with a stellar classification of K3IIICN0.5, indicating that this star has consumed the hydrogen at its core and has evolved away from the main sequence. The CN0.5 notation indicates a mild overabundance of the cyanide (CN) molecule. The star has expanded to an estimated radius of about 65 times the radius of the Sun and is emitting 1,000 times the Sun's luminosity. The photosphere has an effective temperature of 4,090 K, giving the star the characteristic orange hue of a K-type star. Based upon parallax measurements, this star is 498±9 ly from the Earth. It is not known to have a companion.

== Naming ==
In Chinese caused by adaptation of the European southern hemisphere constellations into the Chinese system, 異雀 (Yì Què), meaning Exotic Bird, refers to an asterism consisting of α Apodis, ζ Apodis, ι Apodis, β Apodis, γ Apodis, δ Octantis, δ^{1} Apodis, η Apodis, and ε Apodis. Consequently, α Apodis itself is known as 異雀八 (Yì Què bā, English: the Eighth Star of Exotic Bird.)

Paradys-vogel was the original Dutch name for the constellation Apus, which represents a bird-of-paradise. The IAU Working Group on Star Names approved the name Paradys for this star on 18 May 2025 and it is now so entered in the IAU Catalog of Star Names.
