= Zeta Apodis =

Star in the constellation Apus

ζ Apodis
- Location of ζ Apodis (circled)

Observation data Epoch J2000 Equinox ICRS
- Constellation: Apus
- Right ascension: 17^{h} 21^{m} 59.47769^{s}
- Declination: −67° 46′ 14.4084″
- Apparent magnitude (V): +4.78

Characteristics
- Spectral type: K2 III
- U−B color index: +1.27
- B−V color index: +1.21

Astrometry
| Radial velocity (R_{v}) | +11.38±0.12 km/s |
| Proper motion (μ) | RA: −37.437 mas/yr Dec.: −7.925 mas/yr |
| Parallax (π) | 11.1175±0.1047 mas |
| Distance | 293 ± 3 ly (89.9 ± 0.8 pc) |
| Absolute magnitude (M_{V}) | −0.04 |

Details
| Mass | 1.51+0.99 −0.53 M_{☉} |
| Radius | 18.608 R_{☉} |
| Luminosity | 126±8 L_{☉} |
| Temperature | 4,486±125 K |
| Metallicity [Fe/H] | −0.30 dex |

Other designations
- ζ Aps, CPD−67 3310, FK5 3374, HD 156277, HIP 84969, HR 6417, SAO 253882

Database references
| SIMBAD | data |

Zeta Apodis is a star in the southern constellation of Apus. Its identifier is a Bayer designation that is Latinized from ζ Apodis, and abbreviated Zet Aps or ζ Aps, respectively. The star has an apparent visual magnitude of +4.78, which is bright enough to allow it to be seen with the naked eye. The distance to this star is known from parallax measurements to be around 293 light-years (90 parsecs). It is drifting further away with a heliocentric radial velocity of +11 km/s.

The spectrum of Zeta Apodis matches a stellar classification of K2 III, with the luminosity class of III indicating it is an evolved giant star. Zeta Apodis has roughly 1.5 times the Sun's mass, and expanded to 18 times the size of the Sun. It radiates 126 times the luminosity of the Sun from its photosphere at an effective temperature of 4,486 K, giving it the orange-hued glow of a K-type star.

== Naming ==
In Chinese caused by adaptation of the European southern hemisphere constellations into the Chinese system, 異雀 (Yì Què), meaning Exotic Bird, refers to an asterism consisting of ζ Apodis, ι Apodis, β Apodis, γ Apodis, δ Octantis, δ^{1} Apodis, η Apodis, α Apodis and ε Apodis. Consequently, ζ Apodis itself is known as 異雀一 (Yì Què yī, English: the First Star of Exotic Bird.)
