= HD 99109 =

Star in the constellation Leo

HD 99109 / Shama
Observation data Epoch J2000.0 Equinox J2000.0
- Constellation: Leo
- Right ascension: 11^{h} 24^{m} 17.359^{s}
- Declination: −01° 31′ 44.67″
- Apparent magnitude (V): +9.10

Characteristics
- Evolutionary stage: main sequence
- Spectral type: G8/K0IV
- B−V color index: 0.874±0.002

Astrometry
Radial velocity (R_{v})	+33.060±0.0025 km/s
Proper motion (μ)	RA: −178.689 mas/yr Dec.: −159.528 mas/yr
Parallax (π)	18.178±0.017 mas
Distance	179.4 ± 0.2 ly (55.01 ± 0.05 pc)
Absolute magnitude (M_{V})	5.62

Details
Mass	0.93±0.02 M_{☉}
Radius	0.90±0.03 R_{☉}
Luminosity	0.56±0.02 L_{☉}
Surface gravity (log g)	4.49±0.03 cgs
Temperature	5,270±24 K
Metallicity [Fe/H]	0.315±0.030 dex
Rotational velocity (v sin i)	1.86±0.50 km/s
Age	6±3 Gyr ≥ 12.2 Gyr

Other designations
- Shama, BD−00°2437, HD 99109, HIP 55664, SAO 138182

Database references
SIMBAD	data
Exoplanet Archive	data

HD 99109 is an orange-hued star with an exoplanetary companion in the constellation of Leo. It has an apparent visual magnitude of +9.10, which is too faint to be visible to the naked eye. The distance to this system is 179 light-years based on parallax, and it is drifting further away with a radial velocity of +33 km/s. The star is one and half degrees away from the celestial equator to the south.

The stellar classification of this star is G8/K0IV, matching a late G or early K-type subgiant star. It appears to be past the end of its main sequence lifetime, having exhausted the supply of hydrogen at its core. The star is 93% as massive as the Sun and has 90% of the Sun's radius. It is spinning with a projected rotational velocity of ~2 km/s and has over twice the abundance of iron relative to hydrogen than the Sun. The star is radiating 56% of the Sun's luminosity from its photosphere at an effective temperature of 5,270 K. As of 2006, one extrasolar planet has been confirmed to be orbiting the star.

The star HD 99109 is named Shama. The name was selected in the NameExoWorlds campaign by Pakistan, during the 100th anniversary of the IAU. Shama (شمع) is an Urdu literary term meaning a small lamp or flame. The exoplanet companion is called Perwana, meaning 'moth' in Urdu, alluding to the eternal love of an object circling a source of light.

== Planetary system ==
The planet HD 99109 b has an orbit comparable in eccentricity to the planet Mars in the Solar System but has a mass at least half that of Jupiter. Stability analysis reveals that Earth-size planets could have stable orbits in the planet's Trojan points, located 60 degrees ahead and behind the planet's position in its orbit.

The HD 99109 planetary system
Companion (in order from star)	Mass	Semimajor axis (AU)	Orbital period (days)	Eccentricity	Inclination	Radius
b / Perwana	>0.502 ± 0.070 M_{J}	1.105 ± 0.065	439.3 ± 5.6	0.09 ± 0.16	—	—
