= HD 99109 b =

Gas giant exoplanet

HD 99109 b / Perwana
Discovery
- Discovered by: Butler et al.
- Discovery site: United States
- Discovery date: 15 July 2006
- Detection method: Radial velocity

Orbital characteristics
- Semi-major axis: 1.105 ± 0.065 AU (165,300,000 ± 9,700,000 km)
- Eccentricity: 0.09 ± 0.16
- Orbital period (sidereal): 439.3 ± 5.6 d
- Time of periastron: 2,411,310 ± 80
- Argument of periastron: 256
- Semi-amplitude: 14.1 ± 2.2
- Star: HD 99109

HD 99109 b, formally named Perwana, is an extrasolar planet approximately 179 light-years away in the constellation of Leo. The planet was confirmed in 2006 to be orbiting the orange dwarf star HD 99109. The planet is about one half the mass of Jupiter, classifying the planet as a Jovian planet. The orbital eccentricity is about the same as Mars.

The planet HD 99109 b is named Perwana. The name was selected in the NameExoWorlds campaign by Pakistan, during the 100th anniversary of the IAU. Perwana (پروانہ) means moth in Urdu, alluding to the eternal love of an object circling a source of light (name of HD 99109 is Shama or lamp).

A survey of the stability of hypothetical trojan planets of gas giants showed that Perwana might be capable of hosting habitable Earth-sized planets as trojans.
