= Beta Apodis =

Star in the constellation Apus

β Apodis
- Location of β Apodis (circled)

Observation data Epoch J2000 Equinox ICRS
- Constellation: Apus
- Right ascension: 16^{h} 43^{m} 04.659^{s}
- Declination: −77° 31′ 02.76″
- Apparent magnitude (V): +4.24

Characteristics
- Evolutionary stage: red clump
- Spectral type: K0 III
- U−B color index: +0.95
- B−V color index: +1.06

Astrometry
Radial velocity (R_{v})	−30.3±0.7 km/s
Proper motion (μ)	RA: −281.986 mas/yr Dec.: −354.837 mas/yr
Parallax (π)	20.9535±0.1597 mas
Distance	156 ± 1 ly (47.7 ± 0.4 pc)
Absolute magnitude (M_{V})	0.819

Details
Mass	1.84 M_{☉}
Radius	11 R_{☉}
Luminosity	50 L_{☉}
Surface gravity (log g)	2.82±0.18 cgs
Temperature	4,855±112 K
Metallicity [Fe/H]	–0.03±0.04 dex
Rotational velocity (v sin i)	1.3 km/s

Other designations
- β Aps, β Apodis, CPD−77 1221, FK5 3319, HD 149324, HIP 81852, HR 6163, SAO 257424

Database references
SIMBAD	data

Beta Apodis is a star in the southern circumpolar constellation of Apus. Its identifier is a Bayer designation that is Latinized from β Apodis, and abbreviated Bet Aps or β Aps, respectively. The apparent visual magnitude of this star is +4.24, which is bright enough to be seen with the naked eye. It is located at a distance of approximately 156 light-years (48 parsecs) from Earth, as determined by parallax measurements. The star is drifting closer with a heliocentric radial velocity of −30 km/s.

The spectrum of this star matches a stellar classification of K0 III, which, according to models of stellar evolution, indicates that it is in the giant star stage, having exhausted the supply of hydrogen at its core. The measured angular diameter of this star is 2.09±0.11 mas. At the estimated distance of this star, this yields a physical size of about 11 times the radius of the Sun. The expanded outer atmosphere of Beta Apodis has an effective temperature of about 4,855 K. This heat is causing it to glow with the characteristic orange hue of a K-type star.

== Naming ==
In Chinese caused by adaptation of the European southern hemisphere constellations into the Chinese system, 異雀 (Yì Què), meaning Exotic Bird, refers to an asterism consisting of β Apodis, ζ Apodis, ι Apodis, γ Apodis, δ Octantis, δ^{1} Apodis, η Apodis, α Apodis and ε Apodis. Consequently, β Apodis itself is known as 異雀三 (Yì Què sān, English: the Third Star of Exotic Bird.)
