= Eta Apodis =

Star in the constellation Apus

η Apodis
- Location of η Apodis (circled)

Observation data Epoch J2000 Equinox ICRS
- Constellation: Apus
- Right ascension: 14^{h} 18^{m} 13.89590^{s}
- Declination: −81° 00′ 27.9306″
- Apparent magnitude (V): +4.89

Characteristics
- Evolutionary stage: main sequence
- Spectral type: A2MA7-F2 or A2(m) CrEu
- U−B color index: +0.11
- B−V color index: +0.25
- Variable type: α^{2} CVn

Astrometry
Radial velocity (R_{v})	−9.4 km/s
Proper motion (μ)	RA: −19.981 mas/yr Dec.: −65.222 mas/yr
Parallax (π)	22.9229±0.1180 mas
Distance	142.3 ± 0.7 ly (43.6 ± 0.2 pc)
Absolute magnitude (M_{V})	+1.76

Details
Mass	1.77 M_{☉}
Radius	2.13 R_{☉}
Luminosity	15.5 L_{☉}
Temperature	7,860±20 K
Rotational velocity (v sin i)	17.2±0.3 km/s
Age	250±200 Myr

Other designations
- CD−80 706, FK5 3129, HD 123998, HIP 69896, HR 5303, SAO 258693

Database references
SIMBAD	data

Eta Apodis is a star in the southern circumpolar constellation Apus. Its identifier is a Bayer designation that is Latinized from η Apodis, and abbreviated Eta Aps or η Aps, respectively. Based upon parallax measurements from Gaia Data Release 3, it is 142 light-years (44 parsecs) from Earth. It is drifting closer with a heliocentric radial velocity of −9 km/s. With an apparent visual magnitude of +4.9, it can be viewed with the naked eye from the Southern Hemisphere.

== Properties ==
This star has about 1.77 times the mass of the Sun and 2.13 times the Sun's radius. It is radiating 15.5 times the luminosity of the Sun from its outer atmosphere at an effective temperature of 7,860 K. Eta Apodis is a young star with an age of about 250 million years, and is spinning with a projected rotational velocity of 17 km/s.

The stellar classification of Eta Apodis shows this to be an Am star, which means the spectrum shows chemically peculiarities. In particular, it is an A2-type star showing an excess of the elements chromium and europium. The spectrum displays magnetically-induced features indicating an estimated surface field strength of roughly 360 G. Data from the TESS satellite found it to be an Alpha^{2} Canum Venaticorum-type variable star, consistent with its magnetic and chemical properties. The variability range is only a thousandth of a magnitude.

Based upon observations with the Spitzer Space Telescope, this system is emitting an excess of 24 μm infrared radiation. This may be caused by a debris disk of dust orbiting at a distance of more than 31 astronomical units from the star.

== Naming ==
In Chinese caused by adaptation of the European southern hemisphere constellations into the Chinese system, 異雀 (Yì Què), meaning Exotic Bird, refers to an asterism consisting of η Apodis, ζ Apodis, ι Apodis, β Apodis, γ Apodis, δ^{1} Apodis, α Apodis and ε Apodis. Consequently, η Apodis itself is known as 異雀七 (Yì Què qī, English: the Seventh Star of Exotic Bird.)
