= BD−22 5866 =

Quadruple star system in the constellation Aquarius

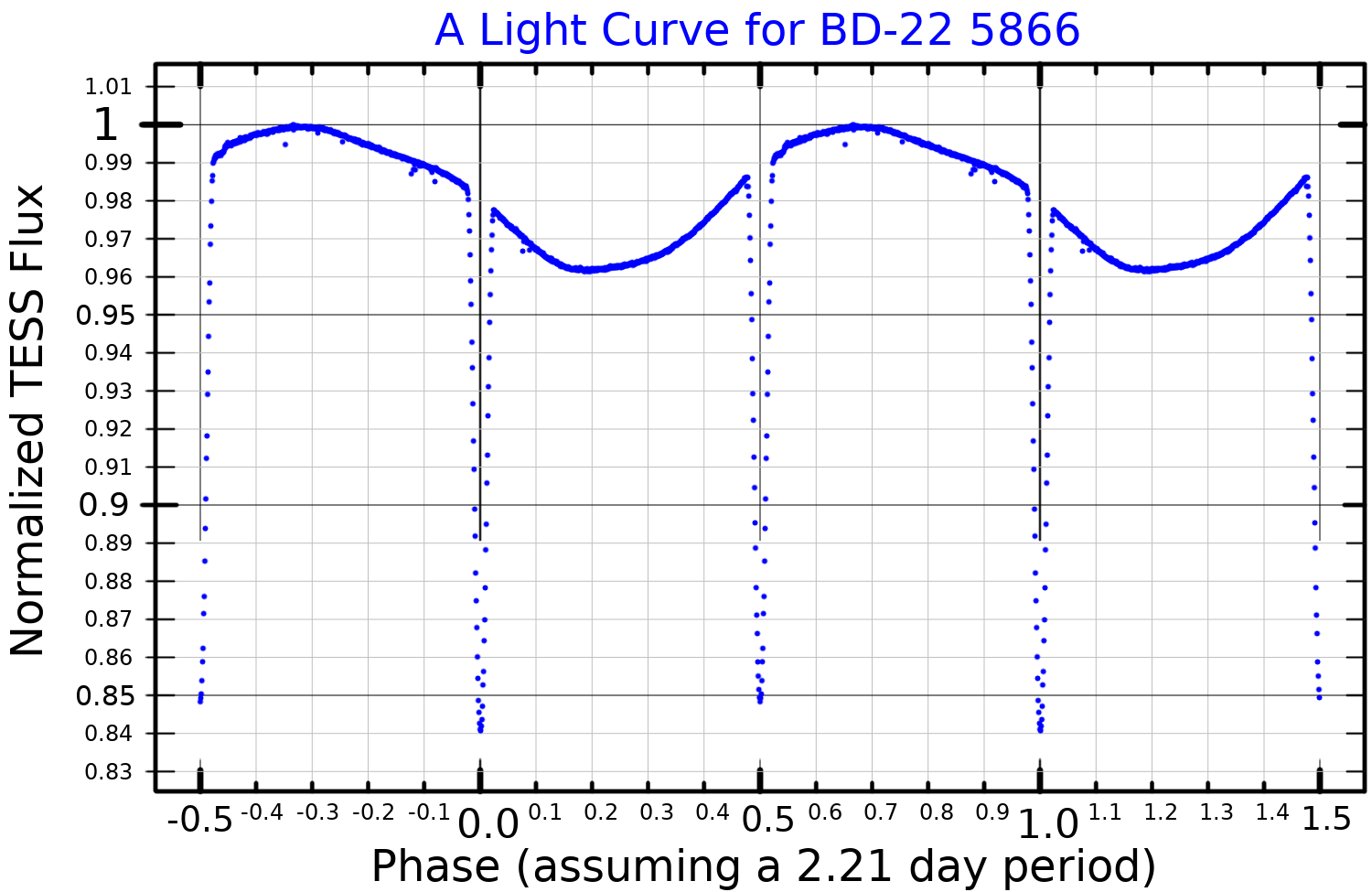
- A light curve for BD-22 5866 plotted from TESS data

Observation data Epoch J2000 Equinox ICRS
- Constellation: Aquarius
- Right ascension: 22^{h} 14^{m} 38.3637^{s}
- Declination: −21° 41′ 53.199″
- Apparent magnitude (V): 10.1

Characteristics
- Spectral type: K7 + K7 + M1 + M2
- Variable type: Eclipsing binary

Astrometry
Radial velocity (R_{v})	−14.07 km/s
Proper motion (μ)	RA: +155.485 mas/yr Dec.: +184.484 mas/yr
Parallax (π)	25.9941±0.1768 mas
Distance	166 ly (51 pc)
Absolute magnitude (M_{V})	12.3

Orbit
Primary	Aa
Name	Ab
Period (P)	2.21107±0.000004 d
Semi-major axis (a)	0.0351±0.0024 AU
Eccentricity (e)	0.0±0.01
Inclination (i)	85.5±1.0°
Periastron epoch (T)	2453937.59
Argument of periastron (ω) (secondary)	82°

Details

Aa
Mass	0.59 M_{☉}
Radius	0.61 R_{☉}

Ab
Mass	0.59 M_{☉}
Radius	0.60 R_{☉}

Other designations
- NLTT 53279, LP 875-68, RBS 1834, 2MASS J22143835-2141535, CPD-22 8173, PPM 273545, TYC 6384-505-1

Database references
SIMBAD	data

BD−22 5866 is a quadruple-star system located 166 light years from Earth. The four stars are each about half the mass of the Sun and are approximately 500 million years old. The system is unusual in how closely the four stars are orbiting each other; one pair has an orbital separation of at most .04 astronomical units (AU) and an orbital period of about two days, the other pair has a separation of at most .26 astronomical units and a period of about 55 days, and the two pairs are separated by 5.8 AU and have an orbital period of less than nine years.

Since current theories of star formation indicate that stars like these could not form in such close proximity to each other, a favored explanation is that there may have been a single gaseous disk that forced them into such small orbits within the first 100,000 years of their evolution. The two pairs are currently moving farther apart due to tidal interaction, indicating that they were once even more closely associated than today.
