= HD 68988 =

Star in the constellation Ursa Major

HD 68988 / Násti
Observation data Epoch J2000.0 Equinox J2000.0
- Constellation: Ursa Major
- Right ascension: 08^{h} 18^{m} 22.17286^{s}
- Declination: +61° 27′ 38.5950″
- Apparent magnitude (V): 8.20

Characteristics
- Spectral type: G0V or G2V or G2IV
- B−V color index: 0.652±0.015

Astrometry
Radial velocity (R_{v})	−69.45±0.11 km/s
Proper motion (μ)	RA: 128.266 mas/yr Dec.: 30.427 mas/yr
Parallax (π)	16.5598±0.0221 mas
Distance	197.0 ± 0.3 ly (60.39 ± 0.08 pc)
Absolute magnitude (M_{V})	4.52

Details
Mass	1.16±0.01 M_{☉}
Radius	1.08±0.01 R_{☉}
Luminosity	1.297±0.002 L_{☉}
Surface gravity (log g)	4.42±0.01 cgs
Temperature	5919±11 K
Metallicity [Fe/H]	0.29±0.01 dex
Rotational velocity (v sin i)	6.4 km/s
Age	1.0±0.4 Gyr

Other designations
- Násti, BD+61°1038, HD 68988, HIP 40687, SAO 14494

Database references
SIMBAD	data
Exoplanet Archive	data

HD 68988 is a star in the northern constellation of Ursa Major. It has the proper name Násti, which means star in the Northern Sami language. The name was selected in the NameExoWorlds campaign by Norway, during the 100th anniversary of the IAU. HD 68988 is too faint to be seen with the naked eye, having an apparent visual magnitude of 8.20. The star is located at a distance of 197 light-years from the Sun based on parallax. It is drifting closer with a radial velocity of −69 km/s and is predicted to come as close as 78 light-years in 617,000 years.

The stellar classification of HD 68988 has been given as G0V, G2V, and G2IV. The age of this star was estimated as six billion years in 2002, but was later revised down to one billion years in 2015. It is rotating slowly and is chromospherically inactive. The star has 16% more mass than the Sun and an 8% greater radius with a high metallicity; what astronomers term the abundance of heavier elements. It is radiating 1.3 times the luminosity of the Sun from its photosphere at an effective temperature of 5,919 K.

== Planetary system ==
There are two exoplanets: HD 68988 b was discovered in 2002 and HD 68988 c was discovered in 2006. The orbit of the inner exoplanet is surprisingly eccentric for such a close in orbit, and over time it may become circularized, although orbital parameters were significantly revised in 2021, resulting in wider orbit. In 2025, the true mass of the planet was measured using astrometry, consistent with that of Rosenthal et al. (2021).

The HD 68988 planetary system
Companion (in order from star)	Mass	Semimajor axis (AU)	Orbital period (years)	Eccentricity	Inclination	Radius
b / Albmi	>1.972+0.017 −0.018 M_{J}	0.0710+0.0012 −0.0014	0.017183893(34)	0.1533+0.0049 −0.0048	—	—
c	15.03+0.90 −0.75 M_{J}	12.1±1.1	38.1+5.3 −4.9	0.399+0.046 −0.049	93+19 −23°	—

== See also ==
- List of extrasolar planets
