= Gamma Apodis =

Star in the constellation Apus

γ Apodis
- Location of γ Apodis (circled)

Observation data Epoch J2000 Equinox ICRS
- Constellation: Apus
- Right ascension: 16^{h} 33^{m} 27.08252^{s}
- Declination: −78° 53′ 49.7334″
- Apparent magnitude (V): 3.86

Characteristics
- Evolutionary stage: red clump
- Spectral type: G9 III
- U−B color index: +0.62
- B−V color index: +0.91

Astrometry
| Radial velocity (R_{v}) | +5.7 km/s |
| Proper motion (μ) | RA: −125.575 mas/yr Dec.: −78.212 mas/yr |
| Parallax (π) | 21.3033±0.1523 mas |
| Distance | 153 ± 1 ly (46.9 ± 0.3 pc) |
| Absolute magnitude (M_{V}) | +0.41 |

Details
| Mass | 2.32 M_{☉} |
| Radius | 10.293 R_{☉} |
| Surface gravity (log g) | 3.074±0.081 cgs |
| Temperature | 5,151±50 K |
| Metallicity [Fe/H] | 0.090±0.042 dex |
| Rotational velocity (v sin i) | 5.016±0.417 km/s |
| Age | 2.67 Gyr |

Other designations
- γ Aps, γ Apodis, CPD−78°1103, FK5 611, GJ 626.1, GJ 9563, HD 147675, HIP 81065, HR 6102, SAO 257407

Database references
| SIMBAD | data |

Gamma Apodis is a star in the southern circumpolar constellation of Apus. Its identifier is a Bayer designation that is Latinized from γ Apodis, and is abbreviated Gam Aps or γ Aps, respectively. It is visible to the naked eye with an apparent visual magnitude of 3.86. From parallax measurements, the distance to this star can be estimated as 153 light-years (47 pc). The star is receding with a heliocentric radial velocity of +5.7 km/s.

A stellar classification of G9 III identifies Gamma Apodis as a giant star in the later stages of its evolution. This is a red clump giant, which means it is on the horizontal branch and is generating energy through core helium fusion. The star has 2.3 times the mass of the Sun and has expanded to 10.3 times the Sun's radius. It is 2.7 billion years old and is spinning with a projected rotational velocity of 5 km/s. This is an active X-ray source with a luminosity of 1.607×10^{30} erg s^{−1}, making it one of the 100 strongest stellar X-ray sources within 50 parsecs of the Sun.

== Naming ==
In Chinese caused by adaptation of the European southern hemisphere constellations into the Chinese system, 異雀 (Yì Què), meaning Exotic Bird, refers to an asterism consisting of γ Apodis, ζ Apodis, ι Apodis, β Apodis, δ Octantis, δ^{1} Apodis, η Apodis, α Apodis and ε Apodis. Consequently, γ Apodis itself is known as 異雀四 (Yì Què sì, English: the Fourth Star of Exotic Bird).
