= List of stars in Apus =

This is the list of notable stars in the constellation Apus, sorted by decreasing brightness.

Name	B	G.	Var	HD	HIP	RA	Dec	vis. mag.	abs. mag.	Dist. (ly)	Sp. class	Notes
α Aps	α	14		129078	72370	14^{h} 47^{m} 51.73^{s}	−79° 02′ 41.0″	3.83	−1.67	411	K5III	Paradys
γ Aps	γ	44		147675	81065	16^{h} 33^{m} 27.46^{s}	−78° 53′ 49.1″	3.86	0.41	159	K0IV SB	
β Aps	β	47		149324	81852	16^{h} 43^{m} 05.42^{s}	−77° 30′ 59.7″	4.23	0.81	158	K0III	double star
δ^{1} Aps	δ^{1}	40		145366	80047	16^{h} 20^{m} 20.84^{s}	−78° 41′ 44.4″	4.68	−2.17	765	M4-M5III	visual double star with δ^{2} Aps; semiregular variable, V_{max} = 4.66^{m}, V_{min} = 4.87^{m}
ζ Aps	ζ	60		156277	84969	17^{h} 21^{m} 59.53^{s}	−67° 46′ 14.3″	4.76	−0.14	312	K1III	
η Aps	η	6		123998	69896	14^{h} 18^{m} 13.97^{s}	−81° 00′ 27.4″	4.89	1.73	140	A2m...	
ε Aps	ε	9		124771	70248	14^{h} 22^{m} 23.20^{s}	−80° 06′ 32.1″	5.06	−1.08	551	B4V	γ Cas variable
δ^{2} Aps	δ^{2}	41		145388	80057	16^{h} 20^{m} 26.86^{s}	−78° 40′ 02.7″	5.27	−1.27	663	K3III	visual double star with δ^{1} Aps
R Aps		18	R	131109	73223	14^{h} 57^{m} 53.16^{s}	−76° 39′ 45.4″	5.37	−0.22	428	K4III	not variable despite designation
ι Aps	ι	58		156190	84979	17^{h} 22^{m} 05.88^{s}	−70° 07′ 23.4″	5.39	−2.34	1144	B8/B9Vn...	binary star
κ^{1} Aps	κ^{1}	29		137387	76013	15^{h} 31^{m} 30.82^{s}	−73° 23′ 22.4″	5.52	-2.31	1200	B1npe	double star; γ Cas variable, V_{max} = 5.43^{m}, V_{min} = 5.61^{m}
HR 6135		45		148488	81141	16^{h} 34^{m} 19.37^{s}	−70° 59′ 17.0″	5.50	−1.80	942	K1IIICN...	
HD 130458		17		130458	72833	14^{h} 53^{m} 13.54^{s}	−73° 11′ 24.6″	5.59	0.63	320	G7IIIa	double star
κ^{2} Aps	κ^{2}	33		138800	76750	15^{h} 40^{m} 21.36^{s}	−73° 26′ 47.9″	5.64	−1.12	734	B8IVe	triple star
θ Aps	θ	4		122250	68815	14^{h} 05^{m} 20.10^{s}	−76° 47′ 48.0″	5.69	0.67	328	M6.5III	semiregular variable, V_{max} = 4.65^{m}, V_{min} = 6.20^{m}, P = 111.0 d
HD 143346		38		143346	78868	16^{h} 05^{m} 55.88^{s}	−72° 24′ 03.9″	5.70	0.97	288	K1IIICNII	
NO Aps		59	NO	156513	85760	17^{h} 31^{m} 27.47^{s}	−80° 51′ 32.5″	5.83	−1.15	811	M3III	semiregular variable, V_{max} = 5.71^{m}, V_{min} = 5.95^{m}
HD 164712		66		164712	89115	18^{h} 11^{m} 15.76^{s}	−75° 53′ 26.9″	5.86	1.41	253	K3III	double star
HD 165259		67		165259	89234	18^{h} 12^{m} 34.17^{s}	−73° 40′ 18.4″	5.86	2.80	133	F5V	double star
HD 131425		19		131425	73415	15^{h} 00^{m} 11.34^{s}	−77° 09′ 37.9″	5.92	−1.23	876	G8II	
HD 138867		34		138867	76877	15^{h} 41^{m} 54.70^{s}	−76° 04′ 54.7″	5.95	0.64	377	B9V	
HD 122862		5		122862	69090	14^{h} 08^{m} 27.71^{s}	−74° 51′ 02.6″	6.02	3.73	93	G1V	
HD 133981		25		133981	74421	15^{h} 12^{m} 34.01^{s}	−72° 46′ 14.0″	6.02	−1.06	849	B8/B9III	
HD 126209		11		126209	70874	14^{h} 29^{m} 37.07^{s}	−76° 43′ 44.5″	6.06	0.04	522	K0/K1III	
HD 161988		63		161988	87926	17^{h} 57^{m} 41.68^{s}	−76° 10′ 40.6″	6.08	−0.23	595	K2III	double star
HD 121439		3		121439	68431	14^{h} 00^{m} 32.85^{s}	−78° 35′ 23.9″	6.09	−0.65	728	B9III	
HD 138289		32		138289	76664	15^{h} 39^{m} 18.62^{s}	−77° 55′ 03.7″	6.19	1.10	339	K2II	
HD 131551		20		131551	73394	14^{h} 59^{m} 55.77^{s}	−75° 01′ 57.4″	6.20	0.15	529	B9V	double star
HD 154556		55		154556	84158	17^{h} 12^{m} 19.85^{s}	−70° 43′ 15.2″	6.21	1.99	228	K1IVCN...	
HD 154972		56		154972	84510	17^{h} 16^{m} 35.70^{s}	−74° 31′ 58.4″	6.24	1.25	324	A0V	
HD 128294		12		128294	71870	14^{h} 41^{m} 59.76^{s}	−77° 00′ 41.1″	6.34	0.05	592	B9III	
HD 162337		65		162337	88599	18^{h} 05^{m} 26.74^{s}	−81° 29′ 11.2″	6.37	−0.89	924	K3/K4III	
HD 137366		27		137366	75959	15^{h} 30^{m} 49.19^{s}	−71° 39′ 14.7″	6.39	−1.15	1052	B3V	
HD 141846		35		141846	78360	15^{h} 59^{m} 55.14^{s}	−78° 01′ 37.6″	6.40	1.76	276	F3IV	double star
HD 124639		8		124639	70418	14^{h} 24^{m} 22.18^{s}	−82° 50′ 53.6″	6.42	−0.74	881	B8V	emission-line star
HD 129899		15		129899	72670	14^{h} 51^{m} 30.07^{s}	−77° 10′ 33.4″	6.44	−0.76	898	Ap...	
HD 152010		50		152010	82944	16^{h} 57^{m} 01.06^{s}	−71° 06′ 41.6″	6.46	−2.08	1663	A5IV/V	double star
HD 124099		7		124099	69778	14^{h} 16^{m} 55.17^{s}	−77° 39′ 51.2″	6.48	−2.82	2362	K2IIp	semiregular variable, V_{max} = 6.46^{m}, V_{min} = 6.49^{m}, P = 528 d
HD 159558		61		159558	86510	17^{h} 40^{m} 44.57^{s}	−67° 51′ 14.8″	6.48	1.15	379	G8III	
HD 134606				134606	74653	15^{h} 15^{m} 15^{s}	−70° 31′ 11″	6.85	4.74	86	G6IV	has three planets (b, c & d)
HD 137509		31	NN	137509	76011	15^{h} 31^{m} 27.12^{s}	−71° 03′ 43.7″	6.87	0.41	638	B8	α^{2} CVn variable, V_{max} = 6.86^{m}, V_{min} = 6.92^{m}, P = 4.4928 d
HD 131664				131664	73408	15^{h} 00^{m} 06.07^{s}	−73° 32′ 07.2″	8.13	4.38	183.5	G3V	has a stellar companion, initially thought to be a planet (B)
HD 137388				137388	76351	15^{h} 35^{m} 40^{s}	−80° 12′ 17″	8.71	5.81	124	K0/K1V	Karaka, has a planet (b)
S Aps			S	133444	74179	15^{h} 09^{m} 24.53^{s}	−72° 03′ 45.2″	9.60	-1.28	4900	C+	R CrB variable, V_{max} = 9.54^{m}, V_{min} = 17.0^{m}, P = 66.03 d
HD 138403				138403		15^{h} 37^{m} 11.18^{s}	−71° 54′ 52.9″	10.47			O8(f)ep	central star of planetary nebula Hen 2-131
Z Aps			Z			14^{h} 06^{m} 54.81^{s}	−71° 22′ 16.8″	11.07				RV Tau variable, V_{max} = 10.7^{m}, V_{min} = 12.7^{m}, P = 37.89 d
L 19-2			MY			14^{h} 33^{m} 07.60^{s}	−81° 20′ 14.5″	13.75			DA4.1	ZZ Cet variable, ΔV = 0.05^{m}
Table legend: • Name = Proper name • B = Bayer designation • F or/and G. = Flamsteed designation or Gould designation • Var = Variable star designation • HD = Henry Draper Catalogue designation number • HIP = Hipparcos Catalogue designation number • RA = Right ascension for the Epoch/Equinox J2000.0 • Dec = Declination for the Epoch/Equinox J2000.0 • vis. mag. = visual magnitude (m or m_{v}), also known as apparent magnitude • abs. mag. = absolute magnitude (M_{v}) • Dist. (ly) = Distance in light-years from Earth • Sp. class = Spectral class of the star in the stellar classification system • Notes = Common name(s) or alternate name(s); comments; notable properties [for example: multiple star status, range of variability if it is a variable star, exoplanets, etc.]

== See also ==
- Lists of stars by constellation
