= Kappa Apodis =

The Bayer designation Kappa Apodis (Kappa Aps / κ Apodis / κ Aps) is shared by two star systems in the constellation Apus:

- Kappa¹ Apodis (HR 5730)
- Kappa² Apodis (HR 5782)

They are separated by 0.63° on the sky.
