= HD 124639 =

Star in the constellation Apus

Observation data Epoch J2000 Equinox ICRS
- Constellation: Apus
- Right ascension: 14^{h} 24^{m} 22.06544^{s}
- Declination: −82° 50′ 53.6732″
- Apparent magnitude (V): 6.42

Characteristics
- Evolutionary stage: main sequence
- Spectral type: B8 Ve or B9 IVe
- U−B color index: −0.33
- B−V color index: +0.02

Astrometry
Radial velocity (R_{v})	+26.70±1.78 km/s
Proper motion (μ)	RA: −15.391 mas/yr Dec.: −9.045 mas/yr
Parallax (π)	3.4127±0.0336 mas
Distance	956 ± 9 ly (293 ± 3 pc)
Absolute magnitude (M_{V})	−0.92

Details
Mass	4.4±0.3 M_{☉}
Luminosity	676+35 −33 L_{☉}
Surface gravity (log g)	3.50±0.10 cgs
Temperature	12,700±380 K
Rotational velocity (v sin i)	237±18 km/s
Age	126 Myr

Other designations
- CD−82°255, HD 124639, HIP 70418, HR 5327, SAO 258697

Database references
SIMBAD	data

HD 124639 is a Be star in the southern constellation of Apus. It has an apparent visual magnitude of 6.42, which makes it a challenge to view with the naked eye even under the best viewing conditions. Based upon an annual parallax shift of 3.41 mas as seen from Earth, it is 956 light years from the Sun. At that distance, the visual magnitude of the star is diminished by an extinction of 0.17 due to interstellar dust. The star is moving further away with a heliocentric radial velocity of +27 km/s.

This is a B-type main-sequence star with a stellar classification of B8 Ve. The 'e' suffix indicates the presence of emission lines in the spectrum from ejected circumstellar material that is being heated by the host star. At the age of 126 million years, it has completed 96% of its lifespan on the main sequence. Levenhagen and Leister (2006) class it as a B9 IVe star, which would suggest it has already evolved into a subgiant star.

HD 124639 is spinning rapidly with a projected rotational velocity of 237 km/s; the centrifugal force along the equator is equal to 56% of its surface gravity. The pole of the star is inclined by 70°±17° to the line-of-sight from the Earth. It has 4.4 times the mass of the Sun and is radiating 676 times the Sun's luminosity from its photosphere at an effective temperature of 12,700 K.
