= HD 121439 =

Star in the constellation Apus

Observation data Epoch J2000.0 Equinox J2000.0 (ICRS)
- Constellation: Apus
- Right ascension: 14^{h} 00^{m} 32.81143^{s}
- Declination: −78° 35′ 23.9308″
- Apparent magnitude (V): 6.08±0.01

Characteristics
- Spectral type: B9 III
- U−B color index: −0.17
- B−V color index: +0.03

Astrometry
Radial velocity (R_{v})	4±4.7 km/s
Proper motion (μ)	RA: −14.337 mas/yr Dec.: −9.094 mas/yr
Parallax (π)	4.2166±0.0425 mas
Distance	774 ± 8 ly (237 ± 2 pc)
Absolute magnitude (M_{V})	−0.80

Details
Mass	3.26 M_{☉}
Radius	5.55 R_{☉}
Luminosity	168 L_{☉}
Surface gravity (log g)	3.48 cgs
Temperature	9,708±124 K
Metallicity [Fe/H]	+0.22 dex

Other designations
- 3 G. Apodis, CD−77°626, CPD−77°922, FK5 3111, GC 18877, HD 121439, HIP 68431, HR 5240, SAO 257107

Database references
SIMBAD	data

HD 121439, also known as HR 5240, is a solitary, bluish-white-hued star located in the southern circumpolar constellation Apus. It has an apparent magnitude of 6.08, allowing it to be faintly visible to the naked eye. The object is located relatively far at a distance of 774 light-years based on Gaia DR3 parallax measurements but is receding with a fairly constrained radial velocity of 4 km/s. At its current distance, HD 121439's brightness is diminished by 0.57 magnitudes due to interstellar dust.

This is an evolved giant star with a stellar classification of B9 III. It has 3.26 times the mass of the Sun but has expanded to 5.6 times its girth. It radiates 168 times the luminosity of the Sun from its photosphere at an effective temperature of 9,708 K. Based on extinction from the Gaia passband, HD 121439 has an iron abundance 1.65 times that of the Sun. This makes the object metal enriched.
