= HD 162337 =

Distant K-type giant; Apus

- Location of HD 162337 on the map (circled)

Observation data Epoch J2000.0 Equinox J2000.0 (ICRS)
- Constellation: Apus
- Right ascension: 18^{h} 05^{m} 26.85525^{s}
- Declination: −81° 29′ 11.6368″
- Apparent magnitude (V): 6.35±0.01

Characteristics
- Spectral type: K3/4 III
- U−B color index: +1.75
- B−V color index: +1.50

Astrometry
| Radial velocity (R_{v}) | −3.3±0.4 km/s |
| Proper motion (μ) | RA: +28.344 mas/yr Dec.: −48.347 mas/yr |
| Parallax (π) | 3.2987±0.0286 mas |
| Distance | 989 ± 9 ly (303 ± 3 pc) |
| Absolute magnitude (M_{V}) | −0.61 |

Details
| Radius | 42.0^{+4.2}_{−4.1} or 67.8±1.6 R_{☉} |
| Luminosity | 495±13 or 1,055^{+28}_{−27} L_{☉} |
| Surface gravity (log g) | 0.71±0.01 cgs |
| Temperature | 4,186±122 K |
| Metallicity [Fe/H] | −0.66 dex |
| Rotational velocity (v sin i) | <1.0 km/s |

Other designations
- 65 G. Apodis, CD−81°673, CPD−81°799, FK5 3990, GC 24431, HD 162337, HIP 88599, HR 6646, SAO 258787

Database references
| SIMBAD | data |

HD 162337, also known as HR 6646 or rarely 65 G. Apodis, is a solitary orange-hued star located in the southern circumpolar constellation Apus. It has an apparent magnitude of 6.35, placing it near the limit for naked eye visibility, even under ideal conditions. The object is located relatively far at a distance of 989 light-years based on Gaia DR3 parallax measurements, but it is drifting closer with a heliocentric radial velocity of −3.3 km/s. At its current distance, HD 162337's brightness is heavily diminished by 0.45 magnitudes due to interstellar extinction and it has an absolute magnitude of −0.61.

HD 162337 has a stellar classification of K3/4 III, indicating that it is an evolved star with the characteristics of a K3 and K4 giant star. It has expanded to 42 times the radius of the Sun and now radiates 495 times the luminosity of the Sun from its enlarged photosphere at an effective temperature of 4,186 K. However, Gaia DR3 stellar evolution models give a larger radius of 67.8±1.6 R_{☉} and a higher luminosity of 1,055+28
−27 L_{☉}. HD 162337 is metal deficient with an iron abundance 21.9% that of the Sun's ([Fe/H] = −0.66) and it spins too slowly for its projected rotational velocity to measured accurately.
