= HD 143346 =

Star in the constellation Apus

Observation data Epoch J2000.0 Equinox J2000.0 (ICRS)
- Constellation: Apus
- Right ascension: 16^{h} 05^{m} 55.8193^{s}
- Declination: −72° 24′ 03.2428″
- Apparent magnitude (V): 5.68±0.01

Characteristics
- Evolutionary stage: horizontal branch
- Spectral type: K1.5 III CN1
- U−B color index: +1.26
- B−V color index: +1.17

Astrometry
Radial velocity (R_{v})	49±0.9 km/s
Proper motion (μ)	RA: −32.468 mas/yr Dec.: +70.299 mas/yr
Parallax (π)	11.3858±0.0386 mas
Distance	286.5 ± 1.0 ly (87.8 ± 0.3 pc)
Absolute magnitude (M_{V})	+0.95

Details
Mass	1.18 M_{☉}
Radius	10.6 R_{☉}
Luminosity	52.6±0.4 L_{☉}
Surface gravity (log g)	2.43 cgs
Temperature	4,520±90 K
Metallicity [Fe/H]	+0.30±0.16 dex
Rotational velocity (v sin i)	<1 km/s

Other designations
- 38 G. Apodis, CPD−72° 1902, FK5 3269, GC 21557, HD 143346, HIP 78868, HR 5955, SAO 257357

Database references
SIMBAD	data

HD 143346 (HR 5595) is a single star in the southern circumpolar constellation of Apus. It is 28.5 minutes west and about 5° north of the yellow giant star Gamma Apodis, which is the second brightest star in the constellation of Apus.

This object has an orange hue and is visible to the naked eye as a dim point of light with an apparent visual magnitude of 5.68 It is located at a distance of approximately 286 light years from the Sun based on parallax, and is drifting further away with a radial velocity of 49 km/s. At that distance, the visual brightness of this star is diminished by an extinction of 0.174 due to interstellar dust. The star has an absolute magnitude of 0.95.

HD 1433456 has a stellar classification of K1.5III CN1, indicating a red giant that has an anomalous overabundance of cyanogen in the spectrum. It is currently on the horizontal branch, generating fusion via a helium core. At present it has 118% the mass of the Sun but has expanded to 10.6 times the radius of the Sun. The star is radiating 53 times the luminosity of the Sun from its photosphere at an effective temperature of 4,520 K. HD 1433456 is a member of the Milky Way's thick disk, but is metal enriched. It spins with a projected rotational velocity lower than 1 km/s.
