= HD 164712 =

Star in the constellation Apus

Observation data Epoch J2000.0 (ICRS) Equinox ICRS
- Constellation: Apus
- Right ascension: 18^{h} 11^{m} 15.80732^{s}
- Declination: −75° 53′ 29.4836″
- Apparent magnitude (V): 5.86

Characteristics
- Evolutionary stage: red giant branch
- Spectral type: K2 III
- U−B color index: +1.43
- B−V color index: +1.24

Astrometry
Radial velocity (R_{v})	14.8±3.2 km/s
Proper motion (μ)	RA: +16.16 mas/yr Dec.: -296.819 mas/yr
Parallax (π)	14.2681±0.0440 mas
Distance	228.6 ± 0.7 ly (70.1 ± 0.2 pc)
Absolute magnitude (M_{V})	+1.48

Details
Mass	1.15 M_{☉}
Radius	9.09 R_{☉}
Luminosity	33.1^{+1.6}_{−1.5} L_{☉}
Surface gravity (log g)	2.55 cgs
Temperature	4,360±90 K
Metallicity [Fe/H]	+0.24 dex
Rotational velocity (v sin i)	<1.5 km/s
Age	4.54^{+0.46}_{−0.56} Gyr

Other designations
- 66 G. Apodis, CD−75°1016, CPD−75°1410, FK5 678, GC 24680, HD 164712, HIP 89115, HR 6731, SAO 257569, WDS J18113-7553A

Database references
SIMBAD	data

HD 164712, also known as HR 6731, is an orange hued star located in the southern constellation of Apus. It has an apparent magnitude of 5.86, making it faintly visible to the naked eye if viewed under ideal conditions. Parallax measurements place the object at a distance of 229 light-years (70 pc), and it is currently receding with a heliocentric radial velocity of 14.8 km/s.

HD 164712 has a stellar classification of K2 III, indicating that it is a red giant. David Stanley Evans gave it a slightly cooler class of K3 III. Gaia Data Release 3 models place it on the bump of red giant branch, a period of temporary contraction. At present it has 1.15 times the mass of the Sun but at an age of 4.54 billion years, it has expanded to 9.09 times its girth. It shines with a luminosity of 33.1 L_{☉} from its enlarged photosphere at an effective temperature of 4,360 K. HD 164712 is a thick disk star with an iron abundance 73% above solar level. This makes it metal enriched. Like most giants, it spins slowly, with its projected rotational velocity being lower than 1.5 km/s.

HR 6731 has two faint companions. Component B is a 13th magnitude object separated 24.6″ away along a position angle of 299°. Component C is a 14th magnitude star 18.1″ away along a position angle of 109°. The first one is a background object while the other one appears to be physically related. As for HD 164712, it shows indications of an infrared excess, suggesting there may be a dusty disk in orbit around the star.
