= HD 129899 =

Ap star in the constellation Apus

Observation data Epoch J2000.0 Equinox J2000.0 (ICRS)
- Constellation: Apus
- Right ascension: 14^{h} 51^{m} 30.03619^{s}
- Declination: −77° 10′ 33.4952″
- Apparent magnitude (V): 6.44 (6.46 - 6.47)

Characteristics
- Evolutionary stage: main sequence
- Spectral type: Ap Si
- B−V color index: −0.03
- Variable type: suspected α^{2} CVn

Astrometry
Radial velocity (R_{v})	2.5±0.7 km/s
Proper motion (μ)	RA: −14.060 mas/yr Dec.: −10.327 mas/yr
Parallax (π)	3.5129±0.028 mas
Distance	928 ± 7 ly (285 ± 2 pc)
Absolute magnitude (M_{V})	−0.57
Absolute bolometric magnitude (M_{bol})	−1.28

Details
Mass	3.43±0.19 M_{☉}
Radius	4.95 R_{☉}
Luminosity	190^{+61}_{−46} L_{☉}
Surface gravity (log g)	3.81 cgs
Temperature	10,617^{+500}_{−479} K
Metallicity [Fe/H]	−0.01 dex
Rotation	1.035 d
Rotational velocity (v sin i)	199±30 km/s
Age	229^{+28}_{−25} Myr

Other designations
- 15 G. Apodis, CD−76°677, CPD−76°894, GC 19920, HD 129899, HIP 72670, SAO 257202, TIC 402517183

Database references
SIMBAD	data

HD 129899 (HIP 72670; 15 G. Apodis), is a solitary star located in the southern circumpolar constellation Apus, the bird-of-paradise. It has an apparent magnitude of 6.44, placing it near the limit for naked eye visibility, even under ideal conditions. The object is located relatively far at a distance of 928 light-years based on Gaia DR3 parallax measurements and it is receding with a heliocentric radial velocity of 2.5 km/s. At its current distance, HD 129899's brightness is heavily diminished by an interstellar extinction of 0.55 magnitudes and it has an absolute bolometric magnitude of −1.28.

HD 129899 has a stellar classification of ApSi, indicating that it is an Ap star with an overabundance of silicon in its spectrum. It has 3.43 times the mass of the Sun and 4.95 times the radius of the Sun. It radiates 190 times the luminosity of the Sun from its photosphere at an effective temperature of 10,617 K, giving it a bluish-white hue when viewed in the night sky. It has a near solar metallicity, having an iron abundance of [Fe/H] = −0.01 or 97.7% of the Sun's. At the age of 229 million years, HD 129899 has completed 95% of its main sequence lifetime. Unlike most chemically peculiar stars, HD 129899 spins rapidly with a rotational velocity of 199 km/s.

The object was observed to be an Alpha^{2} Canum Venaticorum variable that fluctuates between 6.46 and 6.47 within 1.03 days, which corresponds to the period of the rotation. However, this has not been confirmed. HD 129899 has a relatively weak magnetic field of approximately 402±48 gauss.
