= HD 133981 =

Star in the constellation Apus

Observation data Epoch J2000 Equinox J2000
- Constellation: Apus
- Right ascension: 15^{h} 12^{m} 33.97907^{s}
- Declination: −72° 46′ 14.1634″
- Apparent magnitude (V): 6.02±0.01

Characteristics
- Evolutionary stage: main sequence
- Spectral type: B8 IV
- U−B color index: −0.24
- B−V color index: 0.00

Astrometry
Radial velocity (R_{v})	−13.7±1.3 km/s
Proper motion (μ)	RA: −14.107 mas/yr Dec.: −16.361 mas/yr
Parallax (π)	3.8088±0.0418 mas
Distance	856 ± 9 ly (263 ± 3 pc)
Absolute magnitude (M_{V})	−1.34

Details
Mass	3.72^{+0.09}_{−0.05} M_{☉}
Radius	6.35 R_{☉}
Luminosity	364^{+15}_{−14} L_{☉}
Surface gravity (log g)	3.48 cgs
Temperature	10,250 K
Metallicity [Fe/H]	0.00 dex
Age	202^{+23}_{−2} Myr

Other designations
- 25 G. Apodis, CD−72°1096, CPD−72°1714, GC 20391, HD 133981, HIP 74421, HR 5628, SAO 257247

Database references
SIMBAD	data

HD 133981, also known as HR 5628, is a solitary, bluish-white hued star located in the southern circumpolar constellation of Apus. It has an apparent magnitude of 6.02, allowing it to be faintly visible to the naked eye in ideal conditions. The object is located relatively far at a distance of 856 light years based on parallax measurements from Gaia DR3 but is approaching the Solar System with a heliocentric radial velocity of −13.7 km/s.

HD 133981 has a stellar classification of B8 IV, indicating that it is a B-type star that is evolving towards the red giant branch. Houk and Cowley (1975) gave a slightly more evolved class of B8/9 III, instead indicating that it is a giant star. Some evolutionary models show that it is a star just reaching the end of the main sequence. Nevertheless, it has 3.72 times the mass of the Sun and 6.35 times its girth. It radiates 364 times the luminosity of the Sun from its photosphere at an effective temperature of 10,250 K. HD 133981 is said to be 202 million years old.

HD 133981 lies in front of the distant faint galaxy LEDA 54288. A debris disk has been detected around the star. It has 22.5 times the mass of the Earth and an equilibrium temperature of 27 K.

The HD 133981 planetary system
Companion (in order from star)	Mass	Semimajor axis (AU)	Orbital period (days)	Eccentricity	Inclination (°)	Radius
circumstellar disc	1,851 AU				—	—
