= HD 154972 =

Star in the constellation of Apus

- location of HD 154972 on the map (circled)

Observation data Epoch J2000.0 Equinox ICRS
- Constellation: Apus
- Right ascension: 17^{h} 16^{m} 35.64850^{s}
- Declination: −74° 31′ 58.8407″
- Apparent magnitude (V): 6.23±0.01

Characteristics
- Spectral type: A0 V
- U−B color index: +0.00
- B−V color index: −0.01

Astrometry
Radial velocity (R_{v})	−3.1±2 km/s
Proper motion (μ)	RA: −23.266 mas/yr Dec.: −53.910 mas/yr
Parallax (π)	9.6961±0.0359 mas
Distance	336 ± 1 ly (103.1 ± 0.4 pc)
Absolute magnitude (M_{V})	+1.11

Details
Mass	2.56^{+0.39}_{−0.29} M_{☉}
Radius	2.08±0.11 R_{☉}
Luminosity	42 L_{☉}
Surface gravity (log g)	4.24±0.06 cgs
Temperature	9,772^{+228}_{−222} K
Metallicity [Fe/H]	−0.11 dex
Age	330±2 Myr

Other designations
- 56 G. Apodis, CD−74°1187, CPD−74°1610, FK5 3398, GC 23219, HD 154972, HIP 84510, HR 6373, SAO 257478

Database references
SIMBAD	data

HD 154972, also known as HR 6373 or rarely 56 G. Apodis, is a solitary, bluish-white-hued star located in the southern circumpolar constellation Apus. It has an apparent magnitude of 6.23, placing it near the limit for naked eye visibility. Gaia DR3 parallax measurements place the object 336 light years away, and it is currently drifting closer with a heliocentric radial velocity of −3.1 km/s. At its current distance, HD 154972's brightness is diminished by 0.23 magnitudes due to extinction from interstellar dust. It has an absolute magnitude of +1.11.

This is an ordinary A-type main-sequence star with a stellar classification of A0 V. Paunzen et al. (2001) lists it as a potential λ Boötis star. It has 2.56 times the mass of the Sun and 2.08 times its solar radius. It radiates 42 times the luminosity of the Sun from its photosphere at an effective temperature of 9,772 K. It is estimated to be 330 million years old and is slightly metal deficient (78% solar abundance).
