= HD 131425 =

Star in the constellation Apus

Observation data Epoch J2000.0 Equinox ICRS
- Constellation: Apus
- Right ascension: 15^{h} 00^{m} 11.3018^{s}
- Declination: −77° 09′ 37.9863″
- Apparent magnitude (V): 5.92±0.01

Characteristics
- Spectral type: G8 II
- U−B color index: +0.81
- B−V color index: +1.05

Astrometry
Radial velocity (R_{v})	1.9±0.4 km/s
Proper motion (μ)	RA: −13.997 mas/yr Dec.: −10.915 mas/yr
Parallax (π)	3.5348±0.0272 mas
Distance	923 ± 7 ly (283 ± 2 pc)
Absolute magnitude (M_{V})	−0.91

Details
Mass	3.13±0.58 M_{☉}
Radius	22.69 R_{☉}
Luminosity	295 L_{☉}
Temperature	4,750 K
Metallicity [Fe/H]	−0.3 dex
Rotational velocity (v sin i)	9.1±2 km/s

Other designations
- 19 G. Apodis, CPD−76°931, GC 20104, HD 131425, HIP 73415, HR 5547, SAO 257218

Database references
SIMBAD	data

HD 131425 (HR 5547) is a solitary star in the southern circumpolar constellation Apus. It has an apparent magnitude of 5.92, allowing it to be seen with the naked eye under ideal conditions. Located 923 light years away, it is receding with a heliocentric radial velocity of 1.9 km/s.

HD 131425 has a stellar classification of G8 II, indicating that it is an ageing G-type bright giant. At present it has 3.13 times the mass of the Sun and an enlarged diameter of 22.69 R_{☉}. It shines at 295 times the luminosity of the Sun from its photosphere at an effective temperature of 4,750 K, giving it an orange yellow glow. HD 131425 has an iron abundance only half of the Sun and spins with a projected rotational velocity of 9.1 km/s, unusually high for giants.
