= HD 165259 =

Triple star system in the constellation Apus

Observation data Epoch J2000.0 (ICRS) Equinox ICRS
- Constellation: Apus
- A
- Right ascension: 18^{h} 12^{m} 34.08358^{s}
- Declination: −73° 40′ 20.7691″
- Apparent magnitude (V): 5.91
- B
- Right ascension: 18^{h} 12^{m} 33.47381^{s}
- Declination: −73° 40′ 20.9419″
- Apparent magnitude (V): 9.03

Characteristics

A
- Evolutionary stage: main sequence
- Spectral type: F5V
- U−B color index: +0.05
- B−V color index: +0.46

B
- Spectral type: G1 V
- U−B color index: +0.74
- B−V color index: +1.06

Astrometry
Radial velocity (R_{v})	13.1±1 km/s
Absolute magnitude (M_{V})	+2.74

A
Proper motion (μ)	RA: −91.400 mas/yr Dec.: −254.341 mas/yr
Parallax (π)	23.6778±0.0399 mas
Distance	137.7 ± 0.2 ly (42.23 ± 0.07 pc)

B
Proper motion (μ)	RA: −62.130 mas/yr Dec.: −241.999 mas/yr
Parallax (π)	23.7101±0.0338 mas
Distance	137.6 ± 0.2 ly (42.18 ± 0.06 pc)

Orbit
Primary	A
Name	B
Period (P)	450 yr
Semi-major axis (a)	2.014″
Eccentricity (e)	0.3
Inclination (i)	46.7°
Longitude of the node (Ω)	65.3°
Periastron epoch (T)	2147.2
Argument of periastron (ω) (primary)	348.8°

Orbit
Primary	Aa
Name	Ab
Period (P)	44.2 yr
Semi-major axis (a)	0.373″
Eccentricity (e)	0
Inclination (i)	83.5°
Longitude of the node (Ω)	105.2°
Periastron epoch (T)	2027.22
Argument of periastron (ω) (primary)	0°

Details

Aa
Mass	1.46 M_{☉}
Radius	2.04 R_{☉}
Luminosity	6.2 L_{☉}
Surface gravity (log g)	3.92 cgs
Temperature	6,411±218 K
Metallicity [Fe/H]	+0.26 dex
Rotational velocity (v sin i)	<5 km/s
Age	1.8^{+0.1}_{−0.2} Gyr

Ab
Mass	0.73 M_{☉}

B
Mass	0.82 M_{☉}
Surface gravity (log g)	4.3 cgs
Temperature	5,328 K
Metallicity [Fe/H]	−0.22 dex

Other designations
- 67 G. Apodis, CD−73°1348, CPD−73°1888, GC 24731, HD 165259, HIP 89234, HR 6751, SAO 257571, WDS J18126-7340AB

Database references
SIMBAD	data

HD 165259, also known as HR 6751, is a triple star system located in the southern circumpolar constellation of Apus. It has an apparent magnitude of 5.86, making it faintly visible to the naked eye. Parallax measurements place the system at a distance of 138 light years, and it is currently receding with a heliocentric radial velocity of 13.1 km/s.

HD 165259 consists of two main sequence stars, with stellar classifications of F5 V and G1 V, separated by two arc-seconds as of 2020. Speckle interferometry in 2008 revealed the primary to be a close binary itself, with the two components separated by 0.3″. By 2020, the separation had decreased to 0.2″. The outer pair take 542 years to complete a revolution while the inner pair complete their orbit within 32 years.

At present the primary is somewhat more massive than the Sun and a slightly enlarged radius of 2.0 R_{☉} as it is nearing the end of its main sequence life. It radiates at 6.2 times the luminosity of the Sun from its photosphere at an effective temperature of 6,411 K, giving a yellow-white hue. HD 165259A has an iron abundance 82% above solar levels, making it metal enriched. It is estimated to be nearly 2 billion years old and has a projected rotational velocity of less than 5 km/s. HD 165259B has 82% the mass of the Sun and an effective temperature of 5,328 K, giving an orange glow. The faint star orbiting the primary has a mass 73% that of the Sun.
