= HD 141846 =

Star in the constellation Apus

Observation data Epoch J2000 Equinox ICRS
- Constellation: Apus
- Right ascension: 15^{h} 59^{m} 55.13299^{s}
- Declination: −78° 01′ 38.1884″
- Apparent magnitude (V): 6.393 (6.92 + 7.53)

Characteristics
- Spectral type: F3IV (F3IV + F5)
- B−V color index: 0.38

Astrometry
Proper motion (μ)	RA: −1.99±0.63 mas/yr Dec.: −72.24±0.81 mas/yr
Parallax (π)	11.37±0.61 mas
Distance	290 ± 20 ly (88 ± 5 pc)
Absolute magnitude (M_{V})	1.67

Details

primary
Radius	1.66 R_{☉}
Temperature	6,637 K
Metallicity [Fe/H]	−0.18 dex
Age	1.3 Gyr

secondary
Mass	0.78 M_{☉}
Radius	1.66 R_{☉}
Luminosity	5.2 L_{☉}
Surface gravity (log g)	3.89 cgs
Temperature	6,760 K

Other designations
- CD−77°764, HD 141846, HIP 78360, SAO 257341

Database references
SIMBAD	data

HD 141846 is a double star in the southern constellation of Apus. As of 1996, the pair have an angular separation of 0.7″ along a position angle of 332°.
