= HD 137509 =

Star in the constellation Apus

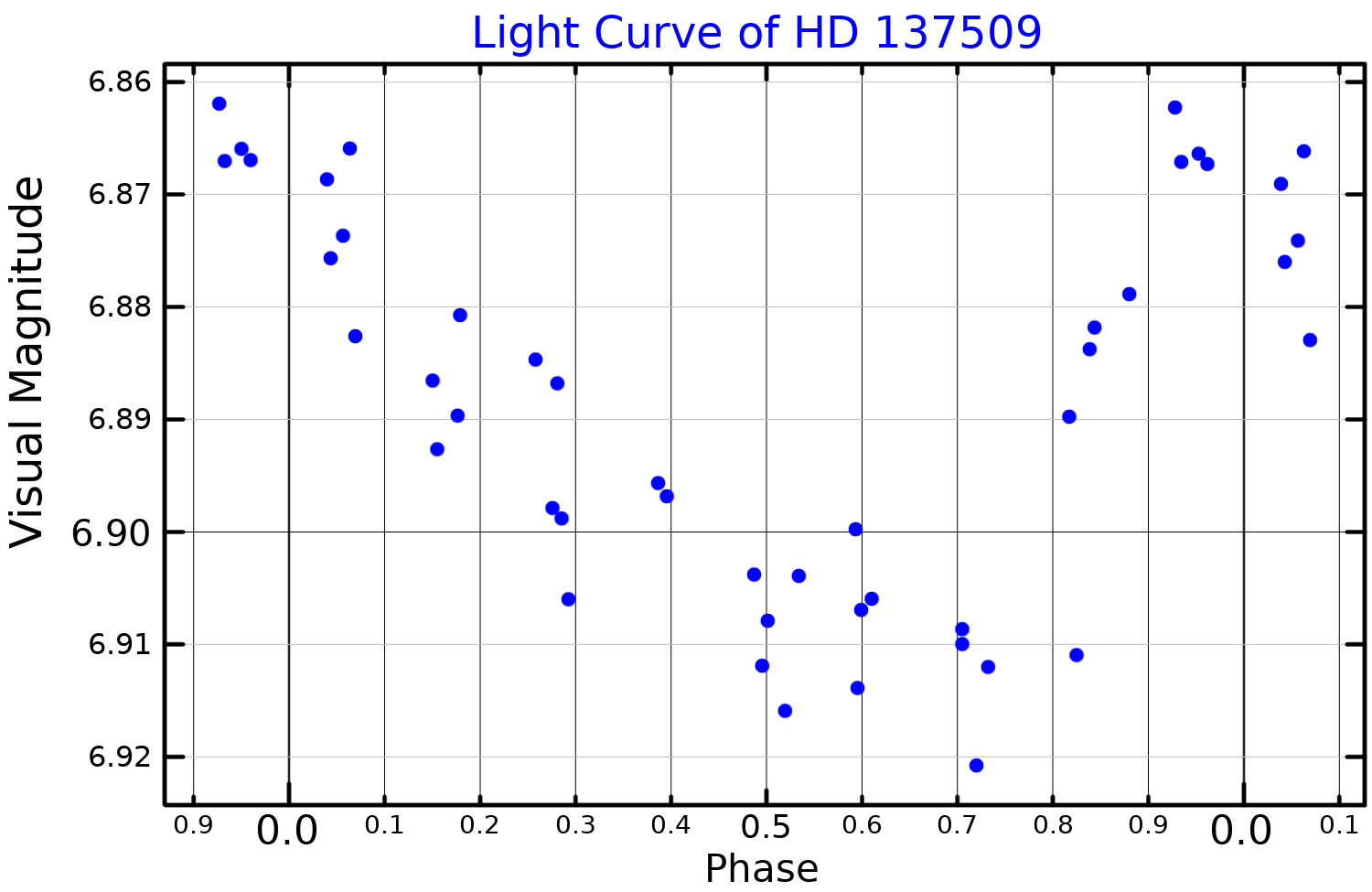
- The visual band light curve of HD 137509, adapted from Lanz & Mathys (1991)

Observation data Epoch J2000 Equinox ICRS
- Constellation: Apus
- Right ascension: 15^{h} 31^{m} 27.11494^{s}
- Declination: −71° 03′ 43.6643″
- Apparent magnitude (V): 6.86 - 6.92

Characteristics
- Spectral type: B9p (SiCrFe); B8 He wk SiCrFe
- B−V color index: −0.125±0.004
- Variable type: α^{2} CVn

Astrometry
Radial velocity (R_{v})	+0.50 km/s
Proper motion (μ)	RA: −16.276 mas/yr Dec.: −15.503 mas/yr
Parallax (π)	5.0410±0.0503 mas
Distance	647 ± 6 ly (198 ± 2 pc)
Absolute magnitude (M_{V})	0.45

Details
Mass	3.43±0.17 M_{☉}
Radius	2.81 R_{☉}
Luminosity	123 L_{☉}
Surface gravity (log g)	4.3 cgs
Temperature	13,100±500 K
Rotation	4.492 d
Rotational velocity (v sin i)	20±2 km/s
Age	124 Myr

Other designations
- NN Aps, CD−70°1302, GC 20810, HD 137509, HIP 76011, SAO 257290

Database references
SIMBAD	data

HD 137509 is a star in the southern constellation of Apus, positioned less than a degree from the northern constellation boundary with Triangulum Australe. It has the variable star designation of NN Apodis, or NN Aps for short, and ranges in brightness from an apparent visual magnitude of 6.86 down to 6.93 with a period of 4.4916 days. The star is located at a distance of approximately 647 light years from the Sun based on parallax, and is drifting further away with a radial velocity of +0.50 km/s.

In 1973, W. P. Bidelman and D. J. MacConnell found this to be a peculiar A star of the silicon type. During a reclassification of the spectra of southern stars in 1975, A. P. Cowley and N. Houk noted the strength of hydrogen lines and weakness of helium are more typical of a class near B9. It shows a luminosity above the main sequence, which is common for a peculiar A star. The stellar atmosphere appears deficient in helium, but shows a rich variety of metallic lines. However, there are no lines of manganese or mercury, so it's not a Hg–Mn Ap star. HD 137509 is now classified as B9p (SiCrFe) or B8 He wk SiCrFe, matching a late-type, helium-weak Bp star with overabundances of silicon, chromium, and iron.

This star was found to be photometrically variable by L. O. Lodén and A. Sundman in 1989, and a variable spectrum was noted by H. Pedersen in 1979. It has one of the strongest magnetic fields recorded for a chemically peculiar star, measured at around 29 kG, and shows a strong quadrupolar component. Both variances of the star allow its rotation period to be precisely measured. It is classified as a Alpha^{2} Canum Venaticorum variable. The star is about 124 million years old with 3.4 times the mass of the Sun and 2.8 times the Sun's radius. On average it is radiating ~123 times the luminosity of the Sun from its photosphere at an effective temperature of 13,100 K.
