= HD 138289 =

Star in the constellation Apus

- location of HD 138289 on the map (circled)

Observation data Epoch J2000.0 Equinox J2000.0 (ICRS)
- Constellation: Apus
- Right ascension: 15^{h} 39^{m} 18.39712^{s}
- Declination: −77° 55′ 04.8196″
- Apparent magnitude (V): 6.18±0.01

Characteristics
- Evolutionary stage: horizontal branch
- Spectral type: K2.5 IIIb CN1.5 Ba+0.5
- U−B color index: +1.36
- B−V color index: +1.21

Astrometry
Radial velocity (R_{v})	+13.1 km/s
Proper motion (μ)	RA: −79.376 mas/yr Dec.: −130.969 mas/yr
Parallax (π)	9.0832±0.0204 mas
Distance	359.1 ± 0.8 ly (110.1 ± 0.2 pc)
Absolute magnitude (M_{V})	+1.21

Details
Mass	1.59 M_{☉}
Radius	13±0.7 R_{☉}
Luminosity	52.5^{+2.5}_{−2.4} L_{☉}
Surface gravity (log g)	2.71 cgs
Temperature	4,672±100 K
Metallicity [Fe/H]	−0.04 dex
Rotational velocity (v sin i)	5.2±4.3 km/s
Age	2.78^{+0.37}_{−0.52} Gyr

Other designations
- 32 G. Apodis, CPD−77°1134, FK5 3228, GC 20948, HD 138289, HIP 76664, HR 5757, SAO 257303

Database references
SIMBAD	data

HD 138289, also known as HR 5757, is a probable spectroscopic binary located in the constellation Apus, the bird-of-paradise. It has an apparent magnitude of 6.18, placing it near the limit for naked eye. Gaia DR3 parallax measurements place the object 359 light years away and it is currently receding with a heliocentric radial velocity of 13.1 km/s. At its current distance, HD 138289's brightness is diminished by 0.25 magnitudes due to extinction from interstellar dust. It has an absolute magnitude of +1.21.

The visible component has a stellar classification of K2.5 IIIb CN1.5 Ba+0.5, indicating that it is a red giant with an anomalous overabundance of cyano radicals in its spectrum. The IIIb luminosity class indicates that it is a lower luminosity giant star. The Ba+0.5 suffix states that it is a mild barium star, whose barium abundance might have come from a hidden white dwarf companion. HD 138289 is estimated to be 2.8 billion years old, enough time for it to cool and expand to 13 times the radius of the Sun. It is now on the horizontal branch, fusing helium at its core. At present it has 1.59 times the mass of the Sun and radiates 52.5 times the luminosity of the Sun from its enlarged photosphere at an effective temperature of 4,672 K. HD 138289 has a near solar metallicity and spins modestly with a poorly constrained projected rotational velocity of 5.2 km/s.
