= HD 126209 =

Star in the constellation Apus

Observation data Epoch J2000.0 Equinox J2000.0 (ICRS)
- Constellation: Apus
- Right ascension: 14^{h} 29^{m} 37.00634^{s}
- Declination: −76° 43′ 44.6977″
- Apparent magnitude (V): 6.06±0.01

Characteristics
- Spectral type: K0/1 III
- U−B color index: +1.11
- B−V color index: +1.18

Astrometry
| Radial velocity (R_{v}) | −8.1±3.7 km/s |
| Proper motion (μ) | RA: −27.950 mas/yr Dec.: −27.585 mas/yr |
| Parallax (π) | 5.8482±0.1281 mas |
| Distance | 560 ± 10 ly (171 ± 4 pc) |
| Absolute magnitude (M_{V}) | +0.18 |

Details
| Mass | 1.22 M_{☉} |
| Radius | 16.83 R_{☉} |
| Luminosity | 196^{+10}_{−7} L_{☉} |
| Surface gravity (log g) | 1.78 cgs |
| Temperature | 4,622±122 K |
| Metallicity [Fe/H] | −0.30 dex |
| Rotational velocity (v sin i) | <1 km/s |

Other designations
- 11 G. Apodis, CPD−76°826, HD 126209, HIP 70874, HR 5389, SAO 257163

Database references
| SIMBAD | data |

HD 126209, also known as HR 5389, is a solitary, orange hued star located in the southern circumpolar constellation Apus. It has an apparent magnitude of 6.06, making it faintly visible to the naked eye under ideal conditions. Based on parallax measurements from the Gaia spacecraft, the object is estimated to be 560 light years distant. It appears to be approaching the Solar System with a fairly constrained heliocentric radial velocity of −8.1 km/s. De Mederios et al. (2014) found the radial velocity to be variable, making it a probable spectroscopic binary. Eggen (1993) lists it as a member of the old disk population.

This is an evolved red giant with a spectral classification of K0/1 III. This indicates that it has the spectrum intermediate of a K0 and K1 giant. It has 1.22 times the mass of the Sun and due to its evolved state, expanded to 16.8 times its girth. It radiates 196 times the luminosity of the Sun from its photosphere at an effective temperature of 4,622 K. HD 126209 is said to be metal deficient, having an iron abundance only half of the Sun's. Like most giant stars, it spins slowly, having a projected rotational velocity lower than 1 km/s.
