= HD 130458 =

Double star in the constellation Apus

Observation data Epoch J2000.0 Equinox ICRS
- Constellation: Apus
- A
- Right ascension: 14^{h} 53^{m} 13.6598^{s}
- Declination: −73° 11′ 23.837″
- Apparent magnitude (V): 5.77±0.01
- B
- Right ascension: 14^{h} 53^{m} 14.0752^{s}
- Declination: −73° 11′ 25.2484″
- Apparent magnitude (V): 7.54±0.01

Characteristics

A
- Evolutionary stage: Horizontal branch
- Spectral type: G7 IIIa (G8 IIb)
- U−B color index: +0.42
- B−V color index: +0.82

B
- Spectral type: F9 IV

Astrometry
Radial velocity (R_{v})	+31.4 ± 2.5 km/s
Absolute magnitude (M_{V})	+0.58

A
Proper motion (μ)	RA: +15.901 mas/yr Dec.: +28.871 mas/yr
Parallax (π)	10.5077±0.3522 mas
Distance	310 ± 10 ly (95 ± 3 pc)

B
Proper motion (μ)	RA: +20.669 mas/yr Dec.: +19.875 mas/yr
Parallax (π)	10.0654±0.0476 mas
Distance	324 ± 2 ly (99.4 ± 0.5 pc)

Details

A
Mass	1.5 M_{☉}
Radius	8.87 R_{☉}
Luminosity	54.7 L_{☉}
Surface gravity (log g)	2.65 cgs
Temperature	5194±124 K
Metallicity [Fe/H]	−0.17 dex
Rotational velocity (v sin i)	3.6±1 km/s

B
Mass	1.41 M_{☉}
Radius	2.8 R_{☉}
Luminosity	7.5 L_{☉}
Surface gravity (log g)	3.96 cgs
Temperature	6,601 K
Metallicity [Fe/H]	−0.18 dex

Other designations
- 17 G. Apodis, CPD−72°1604, GC 19976, HD 130458, HIP 72833, HR 5520, SAO 257206, WDS J14532-7311AB

Database references
SIMBAD	data

HD 130458 (HR 5520) is a double star in the southern circumpolar constellation of Apus. The pair has a combined apparent magnitude of 5.8, making it faintly visible to the naked eye under ideal conditions. Parallax measurements place the system 310-24 light years away and it is receding with a heliocentric radial velocity of 31.4 km/s.

The primary is a red giant with a stellar classification of G7 IIIa. It was earlier classified as G8 IIb, indicating a bright giant.The dimmer component has a stellar classification of F9 IV, indicating that it is an F-type subgiant evolving onto the red giant branch. As of 2008, the pair has an angular separation of 2.167″.

At present the primary has 1.5 times the mass of the Sun but has expanded to 8.9 times its girth. It radiates at 55 times the luminosity of the Sun from its enlarged photosphere at an effective temperature 5,194 K, which gives it a yellow glow. Currently it spins leisurely with a projected rotational velocity of 3.6 km/s, common for giants. HD 130458A is believed to be on the horizontal branch.

As for the secondary component, it has 1.4 times the mass of the Sun and an effective temperature of 6,601 K, giving a yellowish white hue.
