= MY Apodis =

White dwarf star in the constellation Apus

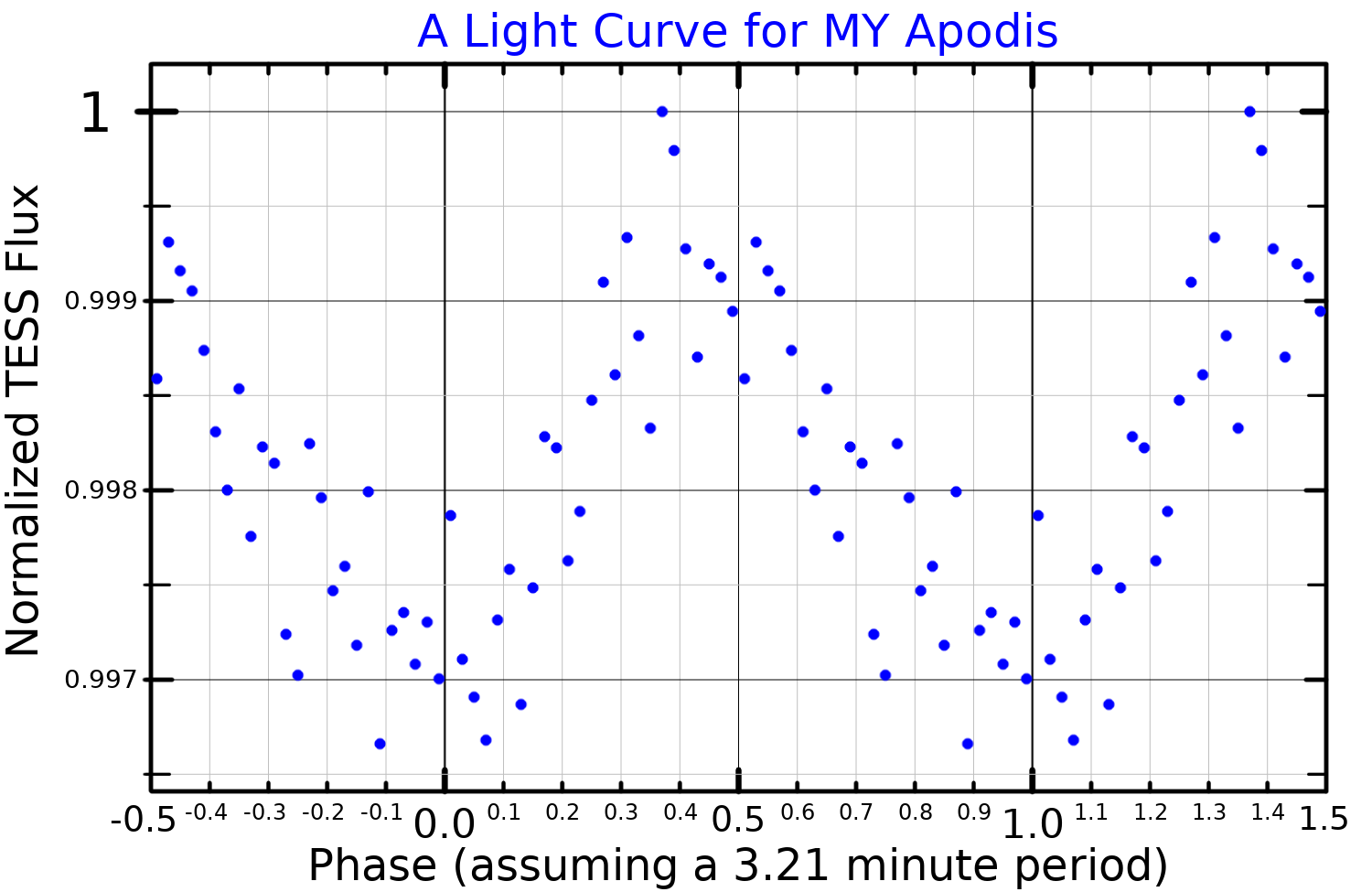
- A light curve for MY Apodis, plotted from TESS data. Approximately 400 raw data points were averaged to produce each plotted point.

Observation data Epoch J2000 Equinox J2000
- Constellation: Apus
- Right ascension: 14^{h} 33^{m} 07.636^{s}
- Declination: −81° 20′ 14.13″
- Apparent magnitude (V): 13.0 - 13.5

Characteristics
- Evolutionary stage: white dwarf
- Spectral type: DA4.1
- U−B color index: −0.530
- B−V color index: 0.25
- Variable type: ZZ Cet

Astrometry
Radial velocity (R_{v})	58.0 km/s
Proper motion (μ)	RA: −154.665 mas/yr Dec.: −389.971 mas/yr
Parallax (π)	47.7874±0.0295 mas
Distance	68.25 ± 0.04 ly (20.93 ± 0.01 pc)
Absolute magnitude (M_{V})	11.86

Details
Mass	0.705±0.023 M_{☉}
Radius	0.011±0.001 R_{☉}
Luminosity	0.00347 L_{☉}
Surface gravity (log g)	8.17±0.04 cgs
Temperature	12,330±182 K
Rotation	13 h

Other designations
- MY Aps, GJ 2108, L 19-2, LTT 5712, WD 1425-81, 1425-811

Database references
SIMBAD	data

MY Apodis, also known as L 19-2, GJ 2108, or WD 1425-811, is a single white dwarf star located in the far southern constellation Apus. It is a low-amplitude variable star with an average apparent visual magnitude of about 13 and thus is much too faint to be visible to the naked eye. Based on parallax measurements, this star is located at a distance of 68.3 light-years from the Sun. It is drifting further away with a radial velocity of 58.0

This compact stellar remnant has a class of DA4.1, which indicates a hydrogen-rich outer atmosphere. It is a pulsating white dwarf (ZZ Ceti star) that varies photometrically with an amplitude of 0.05 in visual magnitude. The low-amplitude variability of this ZZ Ceti analog was discovered by James E. Hesser and associates in 1974, who found it showed periods of 192.75±0.1 and 113.77±0.1 seconds. By 2015, ten different pulsation modes had been identified, and it remained stable over four decades of observation.

MY Apodis has 70.5% of the mass of the Sun compressed down into 1.1% of the Sun's radius. It is spinning rapidly with a rotation period of 13 hours. The star is radiating just 0.35% of the luminosity of the Sun at an effective temperature of 12,330 K. Astroseismological models suggest the star has a thin outer hydrogen shell with a mass of 1.0×10^{−4} M_{☉}, an intermediate helium layer of 1.5 to 2.0×10^{−2} M_{☉}, and a core of 20% carbon and 80% oxygen that extends out to 60% of the stellar radius.
