= HD 128294 =

Blue giant in the constellation Apus

Observation data Epoch J2000.0 Equinox J2000.0 (ICRS)
- Constellation: Apus
- Right ascension: 14^{h} 41^{m} 59.70978^{s}
- Declination: −77° 00′ 41.2260″
- Apparent magnitude (V): 6.34±0.01

Characteristics
- Evolutionary stage: main sequence
- Spectral type: B9 III
- B−V color index: −0.027±0.002

Astrometry
Radial velocity (R_{v})	8.94±2.29 km/s
Proper motion (μ)	RA: −21.428 mas/yr Dec.: −12.249 mas/yr
Parallax (π)	5.2747±0.0603 mas
Distance	618 ± 7 ly (190 ± 2 pc)
Absolute magnitude (M_{V})	+0.07

Details
Mass	2.66^{+0.47}_{−0.25} M_{☉}
Radius	3.62±0.11 R_{☉}
Luminosity	145^{+20}_{−31} L_{☉}
Surface gravity (log g)	3.75^{+0.09}_{−0.04} cgs
Temperature	10,336^{+158}_{−296} K
Metallicity [Fe/H]	−0.09 dex
Age	286 Myr

Other designations
- 12 G. Apodis, CD−76°655, CPD−76°848, GC 19736, HD 128294, HIP 71870, SAO 257182

Database references
SIMBAD	data

HD 128294 is a solitary, bluish-white hued star located in the southern circumpolar constellation Apus. It has an apparent magnitude of 6.34, placing it near the limit for naked eye visibility, even under ideal conditions. Gaia DR3 parallax measurements imply a distance of 618 light-years. At its current distance, HD 128294's brightness is heavily diminished by 0.43 magnitudes due to interstellar extinction and it has an absolute magnitude of +0.07.

HD 128294 has a stellar classification of B9 III, indicating that it is an evolved blue giant. At the age of 286 million years, the object has completed 71.9% of its main sequence lifetime according to Gaia DR3 models. It has 2.66 times the mass of the Sun and a slightly enlarged radius 3.62 times that of the Sun's. It radiates 145 times the luminosity of the Sun from its photosphere at an effective temperature of 10,336 K. According to astrophysical parameters based on the Gaia passband, HD 128294 has an iron abundance 81.3% that of the Sun's ([Fe/H) = −0.09), making it slightly metal deficient.
