= HD 161988 =

Star in the constellation Apus

Observation data Epoch J2000.0 (ICRS) Equinox ICRS
- Constellation: Apus
- Right ascension: 17^{h} 57^{m} 41.686^{s}
- Declination: −76° 10′ 40.62″
- Apparent magnitude (V): 6.07±0.01

Characteristics
- Evolutionary stage: red giant branch
- Spectral type: K2 III
- U−B color index: +1.28
- B−V color index: +1.20

Astrometry
Radial velocity (R_{v})	+36.8±0.4 km/s
Proper motion (μ)	RA: +2.464 mas/yr Dec.: −1.867 mas/yr
Parallax (π)	5.2546±0.022 mas
Distance	621 ± 3 ly (190.3 ± 0.8 pc)
Absolute magnitude (M_{V})	−0.26

Details
Mass	3.05 M_{☉}
Radius	20.8 R_{☉}
Luminosity	185 L_{☉}
Surface gravity (log g)	2.04±0.02 cgs
Temperature	4,498 K
Metallicity [Fe/H]	−0.13 dex
Rotational velocity (v sin i)	2.1±1.3 km/s

Other designations
- 63 G. Apodis, CD−76°919, CPD−76 1226, HD 161988, HIP 87926, HR 6635, SAO 257542, WDS J17577-7611A

Database references
SIMBAD	data

HD 161988, also known as HR 6635, is a solitary, orange hued star located in the southern circumpolar constellation Apus. It has an apparent magnitude of 6.07, allowing it to be faintly visible to the naked eye. Parallax measurements place it at a distance of 621 light years, and it is currently receding with a heliocentric radial velocity of 36.8 km/s.

The object has a stellar classification of K2 III, indicating that it is a red giant. Gaia Data Release 3 models place it on the red giant branch. At present it has 3.05 times the mass of the Sun and an enlarged radius of 20.8 R_{☉}. It shines at 185 times the luminosity of the Sun from its photosphere at an effective temperature of 4,498 K. HD 161988 has an iron abundance 74% that of the Sun, making it slightly metal deficient. Like most giants, it spins modestly with a projected rotational velocity of 2.1 km/s.

HD 161988 has a 14th magnitude optical companion located 26.4 arcseconds away along a position angle of 122°.
