= HD 124099 =

Semiregular variable; Apus

- Location of HD 124099 on the map (circled)

Observation data Epoch J2000.0 Equinox ICRS
- Constellation: Apus
- Right ascension: 14^{h} 16^{m} 55.14838^{s}
- Declination: −77° 39′ 51.1971″
- Apparent magnitude (V): 6.46 - 6.49

Characteristics
- Spectral type: K2 IIp
- U−B color index: +1.33
- B−V color index: +1.42
- Variable type: SRD:

Astrometry
Radial velocity (R_{v})	−10.2±0.4 km/s
Proper motion (μ)	RA: −4.602 mas/yr Dec.: −3.712 mas/yr
Parallax (π)	1.6098±0.0195 mas
Distance	2,030 ± 20 ly (621 ± 8 pc)
Absolute magnitude (M_{V})	−2.10

Details
Mass	4.22 M_{☉}
Radius	71.4^{+3.2}_{−13.5} or 99.4±2.4 R_{☉}
Luminosity	1,545±46 or 2,926^{+74}_{−75} L_{☉}
Surface gravity (log g)	1.29 cgs
Temperature	4,426±122 K
Metallicity [Fe/H]	−0.21 dex
Rotational velocity (v sin i)	5.6±2.0 km/s

Other designations
- 7 G. Apodis, NSV 20066, CD−77°643, CPD−77°940, GC 19200, HD 124099, HIP 69778, HR 5306, SAO 257131

Database references
SIMBAD	data

HD 124099 (HR 5306; NSV 20066; 7 G. Apodis) is a solitary orange-hued star located in the southern circumpolar constellation Apus. It has an apparent magnitude of 6.4, placing it very close to the limit for naked eye visibility, even under ideal conditions. The object is located relatively far at a distance of approximately 2,030 light-years based on Gaia DR3 parallax measurements, but it is drifting closer with a heliocentric radial velocity of −10.2 km/s. At its current distance, HD 124099's average brightness is diminished by 0.47 magnitudes due to interstellar extinction and it has an absolute magnitude of −2.10.

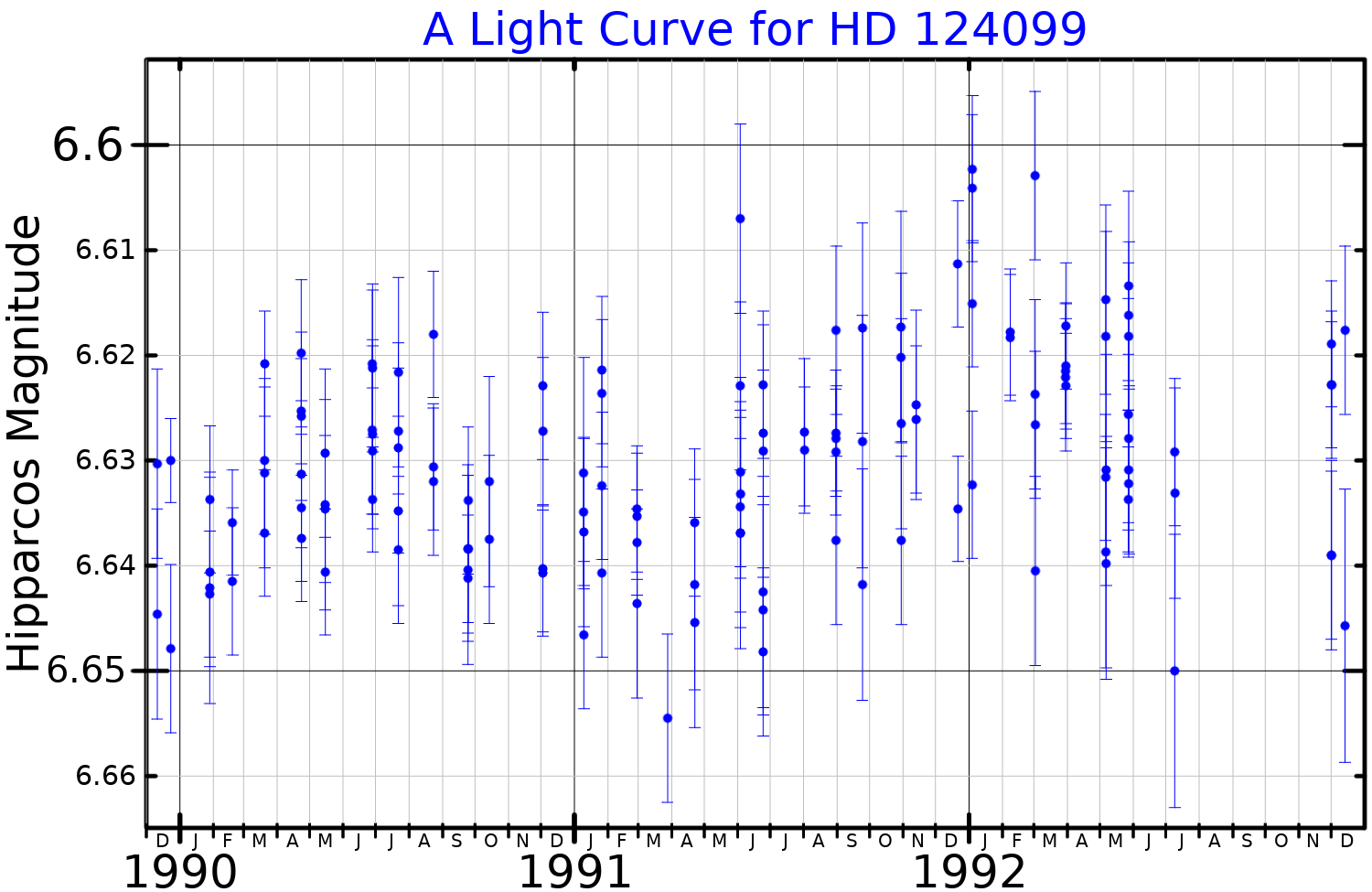
A light curve for HD 124099, plotted from Hipparcos data

HD 124099 has a stellar classification of K2 IIp, indicating that it is an evolved K-type bright giant with peculiarities in its spectrum; the peculiarity being that it has either a very weak or no G-band in its spectrum. It has 4.22 times the mass of the Sun but it has expanded to 71.4 times the radius of the Sun. It radiates 1,545 times the luminosity of the Sun from its enlarged photosphere at an effective temperature of 4,426 K. However, Gaia DR3 stellar evolution models give a larger radius of 99.4 R_{☉} and a higher luminosity of 2,926 L_{☉}. HD 124099 is metal deficient with an iron abundance 61.2% that of the Sun's ([Fe/H] = −0.21) and it spins modestly with a projected rotational velocity of 5.6 km/s. The star is suspected to be a semiregular variable of the SRD subtype and it ranges from 6.46 to 6.49 within 528 days.
