= HD 137366 =

B-type star in the constellation Apus

Observation data Epoch J2000.0 Equinox ICRS
- Constellation: Apus
- Right ascension: 15^{h} 30^{m} 49.18128^{s}
- Declination: −71° 39′ 14.8868″
- Apparent magnitude (V): 6.38±0.01

Characteristics
- Spectral type: B3 V
- B−V color index: −0.112±0.002

Astrometry
Proper motion (μ)	RA: −6.541 mas/yr Dec.: −21.027 mas/yr
Parallax (π)	2.976±0.0439 mas
Distance	1,100 ± 20 ly (336 ± 5 pc)
Absolute magnitude (M_{V})	−1.54

Details
Mass	7.0±0.1 M_{☉}
Radius	5.6 R_{☉}
Luminosity	953 L_{☉}
Surface gravity (log g)	3.73 cgs
Temperature	19,290 K
Metallicity [Fe/H]	−0.17 dex
Rotational velocity (v sin i)	8 km/s
Age	27.7±2.5 Myr

Other designations
- 30 G. Apodis, CD−71°1162, CPD−71°1852, GC 20789, HD 137366, HIP 75959, SAO 257284

Database references
SIMBAD	data

HD 137366 is a solitary blue-hued star located in the southern circumpolar constellation Apus. It has an apparent magnitude of 6.38, placing it near the limit for naked eye visibility, even under ideal conditions. The object is located relatively far at a distance of approximately 1,100 light-years based on Gaia DR3 parallax measurements, but its heliocentric radial velocity is not known. At its current distance, HD 137366's brightness is diminished by three-tenths of a magnitudes due to interstellar extinction and it has an absolute magnitude of −1.54.

HD 137366 has a stellar classification of B3 V, indicating that it is an ordinary B-type main-sequence star that is generating energy via hydrogen fusion at its core. It has 7 times the mass of the Sun and 5.6 times the radius of the Sun. It radiates 953 times the luminosity of the Sun from its photosphere at an effective temperature of 19,290 K. HD 137366 is metal deficient with an iron abundance 67.6% that of the Sun's ([Fe/H] = −0.17) and it is estimated to be 27.7 million years old. Unlike most hot stars, HD 137366 has a relatively low projected rotational velocity of only 8 km/s.
