= HD 138867 =

Star in the constellation of Apus

Observation data Epoch J2000.0 Equinox J2000.0 (ICRS)
- Constellation: Apus
- Right ascension: 15^{h} 41^{m} 54.68806^{s}
- Declination: −76° 04′ 55.0718″
- Apparent magnitude (V): 5.94±0.01

Characteristics
- Evolutionary stage: main sequence
- Spectral type: B9.5 V

Astrometry
| Radial velocity (R_{v}) | 1.1±1.7 km/s |
| Proper motion (μ) | RA: −12.407 mas/yr Dec.: −41.541 mas/yr |
| Parallax (π) | 7.8146±0.0916 mas |
| Distance | 417 ± 5 ly (128 ± 1 pc) |
| Absolute magnitude (M_{V}) | +0.4 |

Details
| Mass | 2.81 M_{☉} |
| Radius | 2.59±0.09 R_{☉} |
| Luminosity | 54.9 L_{☉} |
| Surface gravity (log g) | 4.04±0.07 cgs |
| Temperature | 10,375±48 K |
| Metallicity [Fe/H] | 0.00 dex |
| Rotational velocity (v sin i) | 178 km/s |
| Age | 272 Myr |

Other designations
- 34 G. Apodis, CPD−75°1222, FK5 3235, GC 21025, HD 138867, HIP 76877, HR 5786, SAO 257310

Database references
| SIMBAD | data |

HD 138867, also known as HR 5786, is a bluish-white hued star located in the southern circumpolar constellation Apus. It has an apparent magnitude of 5.94, making it faintly visible to the naked eye if viewed under ideal conditions. Based on parallax measurements from the Gaia spacecraft, it is estimated to be 417 light years away from Earth. However, it is receding with a heliocentric radial velocity of 1.1 km/s.

HD 138867 has a stellar classification of B9.5 V, indicating that it is a B-type main-sequence star just shy of being an A-type star. It has 2.81 times the mass of the Sun and is estimated to be 272 million years, having completed 67.4% of its main sequence lifetime. HD 138867 has an effective temperature of 10,375 K, which combined with a radius of 2.59 R_{☉}, yields a luminosity over 50 times that of Sun. A solar metallicity has been calculated for HD 138867. It is currently spinning rapidly with a projected rotational velocity of 178 km/s.

There has been disagreement in regards to HD 138867's muplicity. Chini et al. (2012) list it as a solitary star while Eggleton and Tokovinn (2008) found it to be an astrometric binary. The first one is more likely as the object has a constant radial velocity.
