= HD 131551 =

Star in the constellation Apus

Observation data Epoch J2000 Equinox ICRS
- Constellation: Apus
- Right ascension: 14^{h} 59^{m} 55.7597^{s}
- Declination: −75° 01′ 57.6124″
- Apparent magnitude (V): 6.19±0.01

Characteristics
- Evolutionary stage: main sequence
- Spectral type: B9 V
- U−B color index: −0.19
- B−V color index: −0.04

Astrometry
Radial velocity (R_{v})	−7.6±1.7 km/s
Proper motion (μ)	RA: −5.659 mas/yr Dec.: −20.787 mas/yr
Parallax (π)	6.198±0.04 mas
Distance	526 ± 3 ly (161 ± 1 pc)
Absolute magnitude (M_{V})	+0.3

Details
Mass	2.84±0.06 M_{☉}
Radius	3.19 R_{☉}
Luminosity	100 L_{☉}
Surface gravity (log g)	3.86 cgs
Temperature	10,651 K
Metallicity [Fe/H]	0.00 dex
Rotational velocity (v sin i)	141 km/s
Age	254 Myr

Other designations
- 20 G. Apodis, CD−74°947, CPD−74°1281, GC 20110, HD 131551, HIP 73394, HR 5555, SAO 257219, WDS J14599-7502A

Database references
SIMBAD	data

HD 131551 (HR 5555) is a solitary star in the southern constellation Apus. It has an apparent magnitude of 6.19, allowing it to be faintly seen with the naked eye under ideal conditions. Located 526 light years away, the object is approaching the Sun with a heliocentric radial velocity of 7.6 km/s.

HD 131551 has a stellar classification of B9 V, indicating that it is an ordinary B-type main-sequence star. At present it has 2.84 times the mass of the Sun and a radius of 3.19 R_{☉}. It shines at 100 times the luminosity of the Sun from its photosphere at an effective temperature of 10,651 K, giving it a blue-white hue. This object is 254 million years old – having completed 70.1% of its main sequence lifetime – and is spinning rapidly with a projected rotational velocity of 141 km/s. HD 131551 has a similar metallicity compared to the Sun.

There is a 13th magnitude companion star at an angular separation of 34.5″ along a position angle of 123° (as of 2010).
