= HD 152010 =

Star in the constellation Apus

Observation data Epoch J2000 Equinox ICRS
- Constellation: Apus
- Right ascension: 16^{h} 57^{m} 01.0485^{s}
- Declination: −71° 06′ 41.921″
- Apparent magnitude (V): 6.48±0.01

Characteristics
- Evolutionary stage: subgiant
- Spectral type: A5 IV/V
- U−B color index: +0.15
- B−V color index: +0.26

Astrometry
Radial velocity (R_{v})	−15.0±0.5 km/s
Proper motion (μ)	RA: −8.941 mas/yr Dec.: −36.107 mas/yr
Parallax (π)	3.2415±0.0204 mas
Distance	1,006 ± 6 ly (308 ± 2 pc)
Absolute magnitude (M_{V})	−0.95

Details
Mass	2.2 M_{☉}
Radius	10.01 R_{☉}
Luminosity	193 L_{☉}
Surface gravity (log g)	2.85 cgs
Temperature	7,155 K
Metallicity [Fe/H]	−1.49 dex
Rotational velocity (v sin i)	61.5±2.5 km/s
Age	179 Myr

Other designations
- 50 G. Apodis, CD−70°1475, CPD−70°2326, GC 22763, HD 152010, HIP 82944, SAO 257446, WDS J16570-7107AB

Database references
SIMBAD	data

HD 152010 is a solitary star in the southern circumpolar constellation Apus. It has an apparent magnitude of 6.48, placing it near the maximum visibility for the naked eye. Located 1,006 light-years away, the object is approaching the Solar System with a heliocentric radial velocity of −15 km/s.

This A-type star has either luminosity class intermediate between a subgiant and a main-sequence star. At present it has 2.2 times the mass of the Sun but has expanded to ten times its diameter. It shines at 193 L_{☉} from its enlarged photosphere at an effective temperature of 7,155 K, giving it a white glow. HD 152010 is 179 million years old—2.1% past the main sequence—and spins quickly with a projected rotational velocity of 61.5 km/s. There is a 12th-magnitude companion star at an angular separation of 2.9″ along a position angle of 162° (as of 2016).
