= IC 4499 =

Globular cluster in the constellation Apus

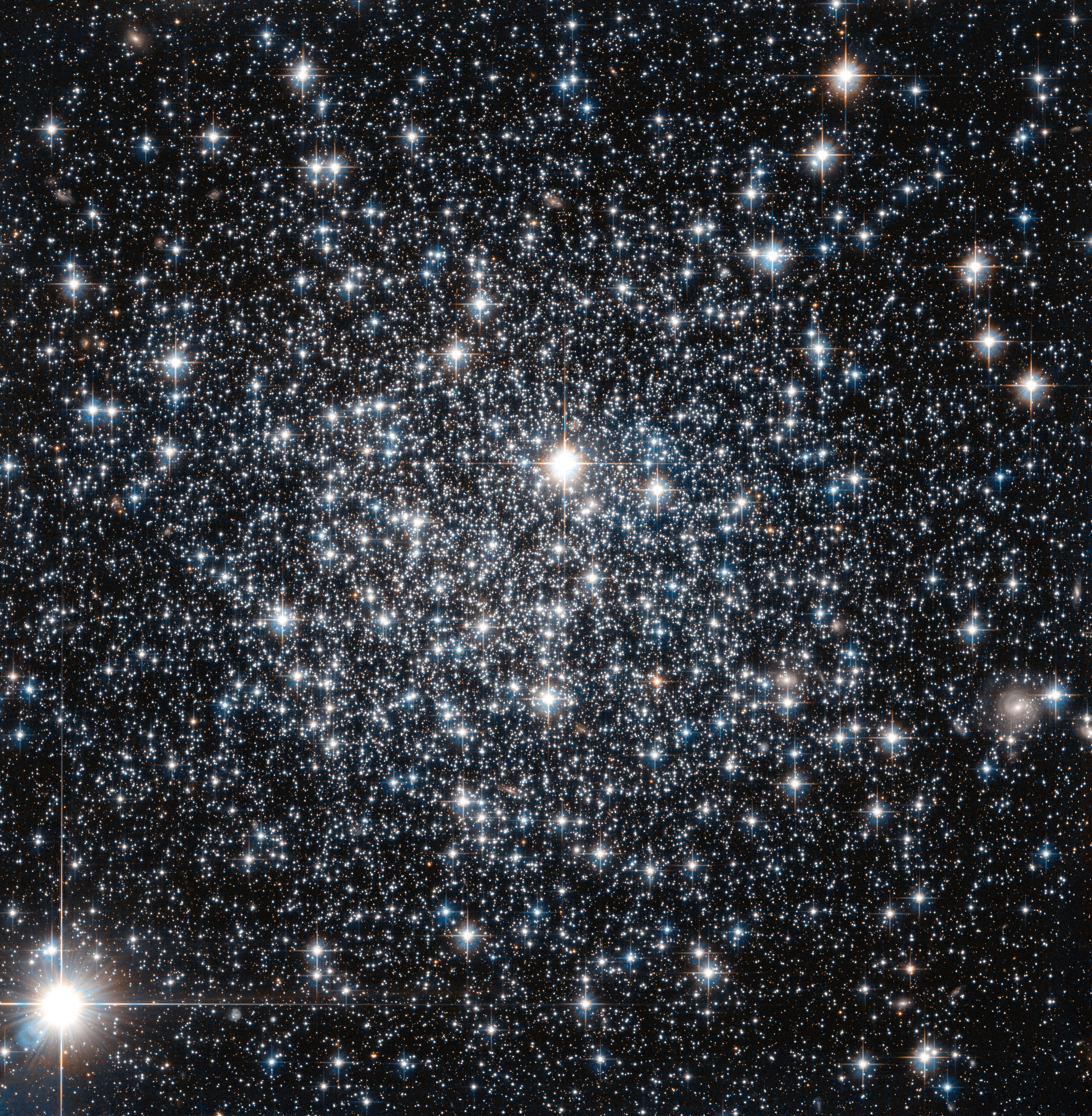
- IC 4499, as seen through the Hubble Space Telescope

Observation data (J2000 epoch)
- Class: XI
- Constellation: Apus
- Right ascension: 15^{h} 00^{m} 18.57^{s}
- Declination: −82° 12′ 49.6″
- Distance: 50,000 ly (15,000 pc)
- Apparent magnitude (V): 9.76
- Apparent dimensions (V): 7.6′ × 7.6′

Physical characteristics
- Metallicity: $\begin{smallmatrix}\left[\ce{Fe}/\ce{H}\right]\end{smallmatrix}$ = −1.53 dex
- Other designations: GCl 30

IC 4499 is a loose globular cluster in the constellation Apus. It is located in the medium-far galactic halo. Its apparent magnitude is 9.76, and was thought to be unusual because it appears to be 3–4 billion years younger than most other globular clusters in the Milky Way, as determined by metallicity measurements in 1995. However, this was contradicted in 2011 by results that yielded a much older age of 12 billion years.

As is typical for very old globular clusters, IC 4499 contains two generations of stars.
