= HD 154556 =

Star in the constellation of Apus

- location of HD 154556 in red

Observation data Epoch J2000.0 Equinox ICRS
- Constellation: Apus
- Right ascension: 17^{h} 12^{m} 19.93421^{s}
- Declination: −70° 43′ 15.8963″
- Apparent magnitude (V): 6.21±0.01

Characteristics
- Evolutionary stage: subgiant
- Spectral type: K1 IV CN3
- U−B color index: +1.04
- B−V color index: +1.06

Astrometry
Radial velocity (R_{v})	−24±0.4 km/s
Proper motion (μ)	RA: +49.060 mas/yr Dec.: −78.104 mas/yr
Parallax (π)	14.3386±0.0224 mas
Distance	227.5 ± 0.4 ly (69.7 ± 0.1 pc)
Absolute magnitude (M_{V})	+2.10

Details
Mass	1.25 M_{☉}
Radius	6.35±0.32 R_{☉}
Luminosity	19.7±0.1 L_{☉}
Surface gravity (log g)	2.90±0.25 cgs
Temperature	4,677 K
Metallicity [Fe/H]	+0.04±0.09 dex
Rotational velocity (v sin i)	<1 km/s
Age	3.52^{+0.36}_{−0.37} Gyr

Other designations
- 55 G. Apodis, CD−70°1498, CPD−70°2361, GC 23140, HD 154556, HIP 84158, HR 6357, SAO 257472

Database references
SIMBAD	data

HD 154556, also known as HR 6357, is a solitary orange-hued star located in the southern circumpolar constellation Apus. It has an apparent magnitude of 6.21, placing it near the limit for naked eye visibility. The star is located relatively close at a distance of 228 light years based on Gaia DR3 parallax measurements, but it is drifter closer with a heliocentric radial velocity of −24 km/s. At its current distance, HD 154556's brightness is diminished by 0.26 magnitudes due to interstellar dust. It has an absolute magnitude of +2.10.

HD 154556 has a stellar classification of K1 IV CN3, indicating that it is an evolved K-type subgiant with a moderate abundance of cyano radicals in its spectrum, making it a CN star. It has 1.25 times the mass of the Sun and is calculated to be 3.52 billion years old, having expanded to 6.35 times the radius of the Sun. It now radiates 19.7 times the luminosity of the Sun from its enlarged photosphere at an effective temperature of 4,677 K. It has a near solar metallicity and spins slowly with a projected rotational velocity lower than 1 km/s.
