= HR 6135 =

Star in the constellation Apus

Observation data Epoch J2000 Equinox J2000
- Constellation: Apus
- Right ascension: 16^{h} 34^{m} 19.34618^{s}
- Declination: −70° 59′ 17.1680″
- Apparent magnitude (V): 5.50

Characteristics
- Evolutionary stage: red giant branch
- Spectral type: K0.5 IIb CN1
- B−V color index: 1.235±0.004

Astrometry
Radial velocity (R_{v})	−9.37±0.14 km/s
Proper motion (μ)	RA: −15.427±0.036 mas/yr Dec.: −11.056±0.046 mas/yr
Parallax (π)	3.2585±0.0357 mas
Distance	1,000 ± 10 ly (307 ± 3 pc)
Absolute magnitude (M_{V})	−1.45

Details
Mass	5.4 M_{☉}
Radius	49 R_{☉}
Luminosity	843 L_{☉}
Surface gravity (log g)	1.66 cgs
Temperature	4,592 K
Rotational velocity (v sin i)	4.2 km/s

Other designations
- CPD−70°2256, FK5 3306, GC 22212, HD 148488, HIP 81141, HR 6135, SAO 257409

Database references
SIMBAD	data

HR 6135 is a single star in the southern constellation of Apus, less than a degree from the northern constellation border with Triangulum Australe. Its declination of −70° 59.3′ puts it just within 20 degrees of the southern celestial pole. The star has an orange hue and is faintly visible to the naked eye with an apparent visual magnitude of 5.50, making it the 12th-brightest star in the constellation. It is located at a distance of approximately 1,000 light years from the Sun based on parallax, but is drifting closer with a radial velocity of −9.5 km/s. It has an absolute magnitude of −1.45.

This is an aging bright giant with a stellar classification of K0.5IIbCN1, where the suffix notation indicates an anomalous overabundance of cyanogen in the spectrum. It is a mild barium star, which may indicate it is on the asymptotic giant branch stage of its evolution. The star has expanded to 49 times the radius of the Sun and is radiating 843 times the Sun's luminosity from its swollen photosphere at an effective temperature of 4,592 K.
