= Kappa1 Apodis =

Star in the constellation Apus

Kappa^{1} Apodis
- Location of Kappa^{1} Apodis (circled)

Observation data Epoch J2000 Equinox ICRS
- Constellation: Apus
- Right ascension: 15^{h} 31^{m} 30.82213^{s}
- Declination: −73° 23′ 22.5295″
- Apparent magnitude (V): 5.52

Characteristics
- Spectral type: B1npe + sdO
- U−B color index: −0.791
- B−V color index: −0.128
- Variable type: γ Cas

Astrometry
Radial velocity (R_{v})	+62 km/s
Proper motion (μ)	RA: +0.996 mas/yr Dec.: −18.345 mas/yr
Parallax (π)	3.0798±0.0717 mas
Distance	1,060 ± 20 ly (325 ± 8 pc)
Absolute magnitude (M_{V})	−2.47

Orbit
Period (P)	192.1±0.1 d
Semi-major axis (a)	≥ 288.3±8.4 R_{☉}
Eccentricity (e)	0 (assumed)
Inclination (i)	60±4°
Periastron epoch (T)	2458401.9±2.2 HJD
Semi-amplitude (K_{1}) (primary)	9.09±0.08 km/s
Semi-amplitude (K_{2}) (secondary)	66.87±1.84 km/s

Details

A
Mass	11.8±1.0 M_{☉}
Radius	5.45±0.29 R_{☉}
Luminosity	11,117 L_{☉}
Surface gravity (log g)	4.01 cgs
Temperature	24,000 K
Rotational velocity (v sin i)	250 km/s
Age	19.5 Myr

B
Mass	1.60±0.14 M_{☉}
Radius	0.44±0.06 R_{☉}
Luminosity	446 L_{☉}
Temperature	40,000 K

Other designations
- κ^{1} Apodis, κ^{1} Aps, Kap^{1} Aps, CD−72°1139, CPD−72°1802, FK5 567, HD 137387, HIP 76013, HR 5730, SAO 257289, WDS J15315-7323A

Database references
SIMBAD	data

Kappa^{1} Apodis is a binary star system in the southern circumpolar constellation of Apus. Its idetifier is a Bayer designation that is Latinized from κ^{1} Apodis, and abbreviated Kap^{1} Aps or κ^{1} Aps, respectively. Based upon parallax measurements, it is located roughly 1,060 light-years (325 parsecs) from Earth. The combined apparent visual magnitude of the system is 5.52, indicating that this is a faint, naked eye star that can be viewed in dark suburban skies. It is moving away from the Sun with a radial velocity of +62 km/s.

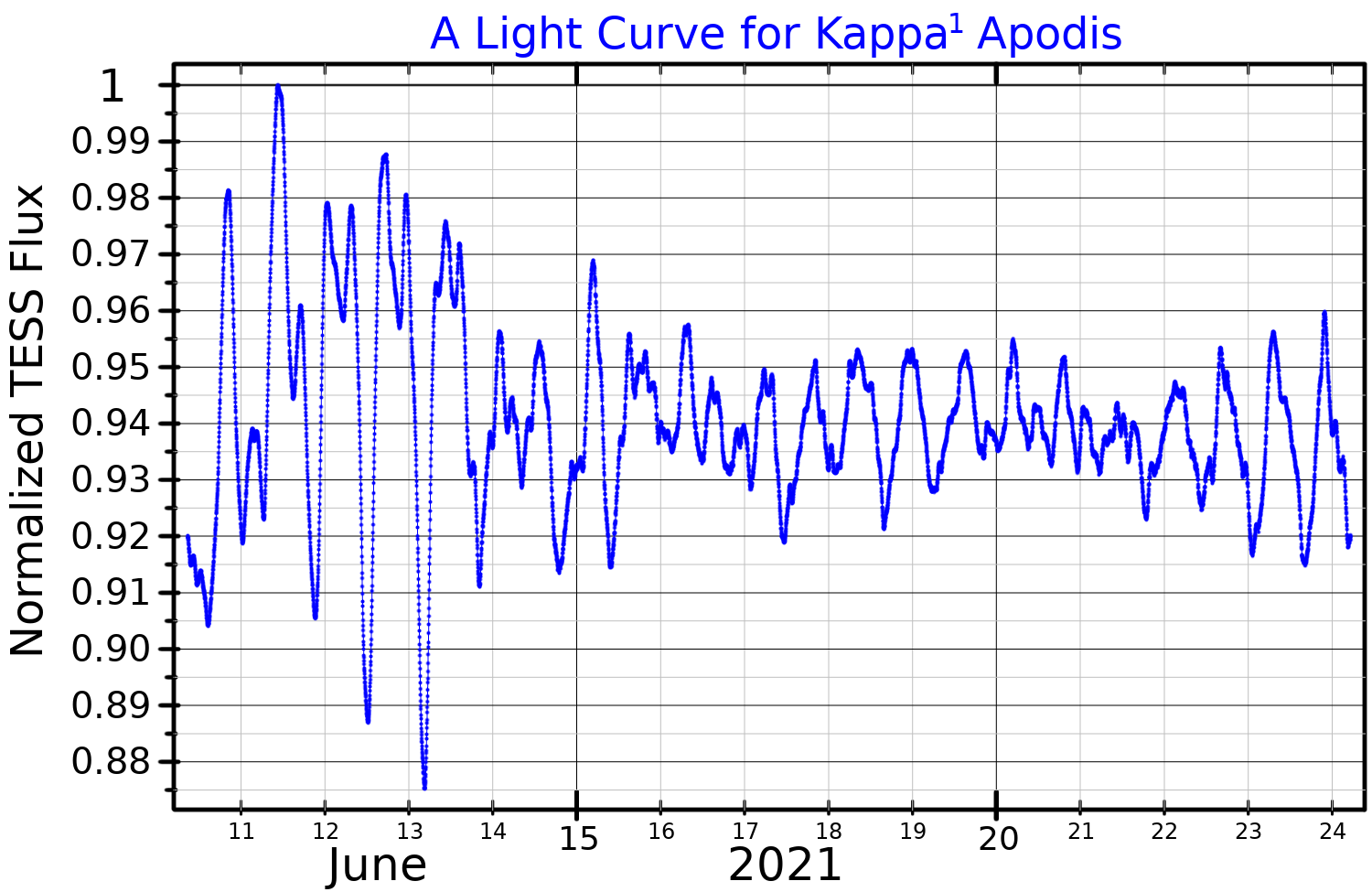
A light curve for Kappa^{1} Apodis, plotted from TESS data

This is a spectroscopic binary system, made up of a Be star and a subdwarf O star, which complete an orbit around each other every 192 days. The combined spectrum matches a stellar classification of B1npe. The 'e' suffix indicates that this is a Be star with emission lines in the spectrum. An 'n' means that the absorption lines in the spectrum are broadened from the Doppler effect as a result of rapid rotation. Finally, the 'p' shows some peculiarity in the spectrum. It is classified as a Gamma Cassiopeiae type variable star and its brightness varies from magnitude +5.43 to +5.61.

This is a runaway star with a peculiar velocity of 69.8±4.7 km/s. Because it is a binary star system, it was most likely not turned into a runaway system as the result of a supernova explosion.

A 12th-magnitude orange K-type subgiant located at an angular separation of 27 arcseconds has a much smaller parallax than Kappa^{1} Apodis and is a distant background object.
