= R Apodis =

Variable star in the constellation Apus

Observation data Epoch J2000.0 Equinox ICRS
- Constellation: Apus
- Right ascension: 14^{h} 57^{m} 52.98352^{s}
- Declination: −76° 39′ 45.5569″
- Apparent magnitude (V): 5.36±0.01

Characteristics
- Spectral type: K4 III:
- B−V color index: +1.44
- Variable type: constant

Astrometry
Radial velocity (R_{v})	−31.20±0.08 km/s
Proper motion (μ)	RA: −69.161 mas/yr Dec.: −16.583 mas/yr
Parallax (π)	7.8879±0.0867 mas
Distance	413 ± 5 ly (127 ± 1 pc)
Absolute magnitude (M_{V})	−0.22±0.16

Details
Mass	1.10±0.18 M_{☉}
Radius	33.9±0.9 R_{☉}
Luminosity	293+9 −10 L_{☉}
Surface gravity (log g)	1.99±0.05 cgs
Temperature	4,318±18 K
Metallicity [Fe/H]	−0.29±0.05 dex
Rotational velocity (v sin i)	2.64±0.45 km/s
Age	5.68±2.42 Gyr

Other designations
- 18 G. Apodis, R Aps, CD−76°688, CPD−76°924, FK5 3175, GC 20057, HD 131109, HIP 73223, HR 5540, SAO 257212

Database references
SIMBAD	data

R Apodis (HD 131109; HR 5540; 18 G. Apodis) is a solitary star in the constellation Apus. It is faintly visible to the naked eye as an orange-hued point of light with an apparent magnitude of 5.36. Parallax measurements imply a distance of 413 light-years and it is drifting closer with a heliocentric radial velocity of −31.2 km/s. At its current distance, R Apodis' brightness is diminished by an interstellar extinction of 0.26 magnitudes and it has an absolute magnitude of −0.22.

HD 131109 was the first star observed to be variable in the constellation; It was first discovered in 1873 by Benjamin Apthorp Gould. Later, it was hastily given the variable star designation R Apodis in a 1907 variable star catalogue despite it being a suspected variable star at the time. However, observations conducted in a 1952 field star survey revealed that R Apodis was not variable at all. Keenan & Pitts (1980) found that it varied between magnitudes 5.5 and 6.1, but this was never confirmed. Hipparcos photometric data revealed that R Apodis indeed had a constant brightness. It has since been listed as a class CST: in the General Catalog of Variable Stars.

R Apodis has a stellar classification of K4 III:, indicating that it is an evolved K-type giant that has ceased hydrogen fusion at its core and left the main sequence. However, there is uncertainty about the luminosity class. It has a comparable mass to the Sun at 1.1 solar masses but, at the age of 5.68 billion years, it has expanded to 23 times the radius of the Sun. It radiates 293 times the luminosity of the Sun from its enlarged photosphere at an effective temperature of 4,318 K. R Apodis is metal deficient with an iron abundance roughly half of the Sun's and it spins slowly with a projected rotational velocity lower than 1.3 km/s.
