= Kappa2 Apodis =

Double star in the constellation Apus

κ^{2} Apodis
- Location of κ^{2} Apodis (circled)

Observation data Epoch J2000 Equinox J2000
- Constellation: Apus
- Right ascension: 15^{h} 40^{m} 21.355^{s}
- Declination: −73° 26′ 48.00″
- Apparent magnitude (V): 5.65

Characteristics
- Spectral type: B7 III-IV + K0 V
- U−B color index: −0.38
- B−V color index: −0.04

Astrometry
Radial velocity (R_{v})	−19.0 km/s
Proper motion (μ)	RA: −15.517 mas/yr Dec.: −26.408 mas/yr
Parallax (π)	4.5583±0.0823 mas
Distance	720 ± 10 ly (219 ± 4 pc)
Absolute magnitude (M_{V})	−1.24 + 6.50

Details

κ^{2} Aps A
Mass	4.995±0.250 M_{☉}
Radius	5.555±0.278 R_{☉}
Luminosity	316 L_{☉}
Surface gravity (log g)	3.86 cgs
Temperature	12,646 K
Age	130 Myr

κ^{2} Aps C
Luminosity	0.25 L_{☉}
Temperature	5,127 K

Other designations
- κ^{2} Apodis, Kap^{2} Aps, κ^{2} Aps, CPD−73°1625, HD 138800, HIP 76750, HR 5782, SAO 257307

Database references
SIMBAD	data

Kappa^{2} Apodis is a double star in the southern circumpolar constellation of Apus. Its identifier is a Bayer designation that is Latinized from κ^{2} Apodis, and abbreviated Kap^{2} Aps or κ^{2} Aps, respectively. This star is located at a distance of approximately 720 light-years (220 parsecs) from Earth, based upon parallax measurements with a 1.4% margin of error. They are approaching the Sun with a radial velocity of −19 km/s. The pair have a combined apparent visual magnitude of +5.65, which makes the system faintly visible to the naked eye.

The brighter star, designated κ^{2} Aps A, has a stellar classification of B7 III-IV, with the luminosity class of III-IV suggesting that it may lie in an intermediate stage between a subgiant and a giant star. Based on observations with TESS, it is a pulsating B star of the Maia type. This star is about 130 million years old with an estimated 5 times the mass and 5.6 times the radius of the Sun. It is radiating 316 times the luminosity of the Sun from its photosphere at an effective temperature of 12,646 K.

A faint companion, κ^{2} Aps C, is a K-type main sequence star with a classification of K0 V. It has a visual magnitude of 12.5 and an angular separation of 15 arcseconds from the brighter member. The pair have a projected separation of around 2,520 au.
