= NO Apodis =

Star in the constellation Apus

- location of NO Apodis in red

Observation data Epoch J2000 Equinox ICRS
- Constellation: Apus
- Right ascension: 17^{h} 31^{m} 27.4667^{s}
- Declination: −80° 51′ 32.876″
- Apparent magnitude (V): 5.71-5.95

Characteristics
- Evolutionary stage: AGB
- Spectral type: M3 III
- U−B color index: +1.80
- B−V color index: +1.67
- Variable type: Semiregular

Astrometry
Radial velocity (R_{v})	−18.3±0.6 km/s
Proper motion (μ)	RA: −3.662 mas/yr Dec.: −43.943 mas/yr
Parallax (π)	4.1479±0.0741 mas
Distance	790 ± 10 ly (241 ± 4 pc)
Absolute magnitude (M_{V})	−1.32

Details
Mass	1.63 M_{☉}
Radius	107 R_{☉}
Luminosity	1,408 L_{☉}
Surface gravity (log g)	1.7±0.1 cgs
Temperature	3,521±122 K

Other designations
- 59 G. Apodis, NO Aps, NSV 8609, CD−80°638, CPD−80°828, FK5 1455, GC 23550, HD 156513, HIP 85760, HR 6429, SAO 258769

Database references
SIMBAD	data

NO Apodis is a solitary, red hued variable star located in the southern circumpolar constellation Apus. It has an average apparent magnitude of 5.86, allowing it to be faintly seen with the naked eye. The object is relatively far at a distance of 790 light years but is drifting closer with a heliocentric radial velocity −18.3 km/s.

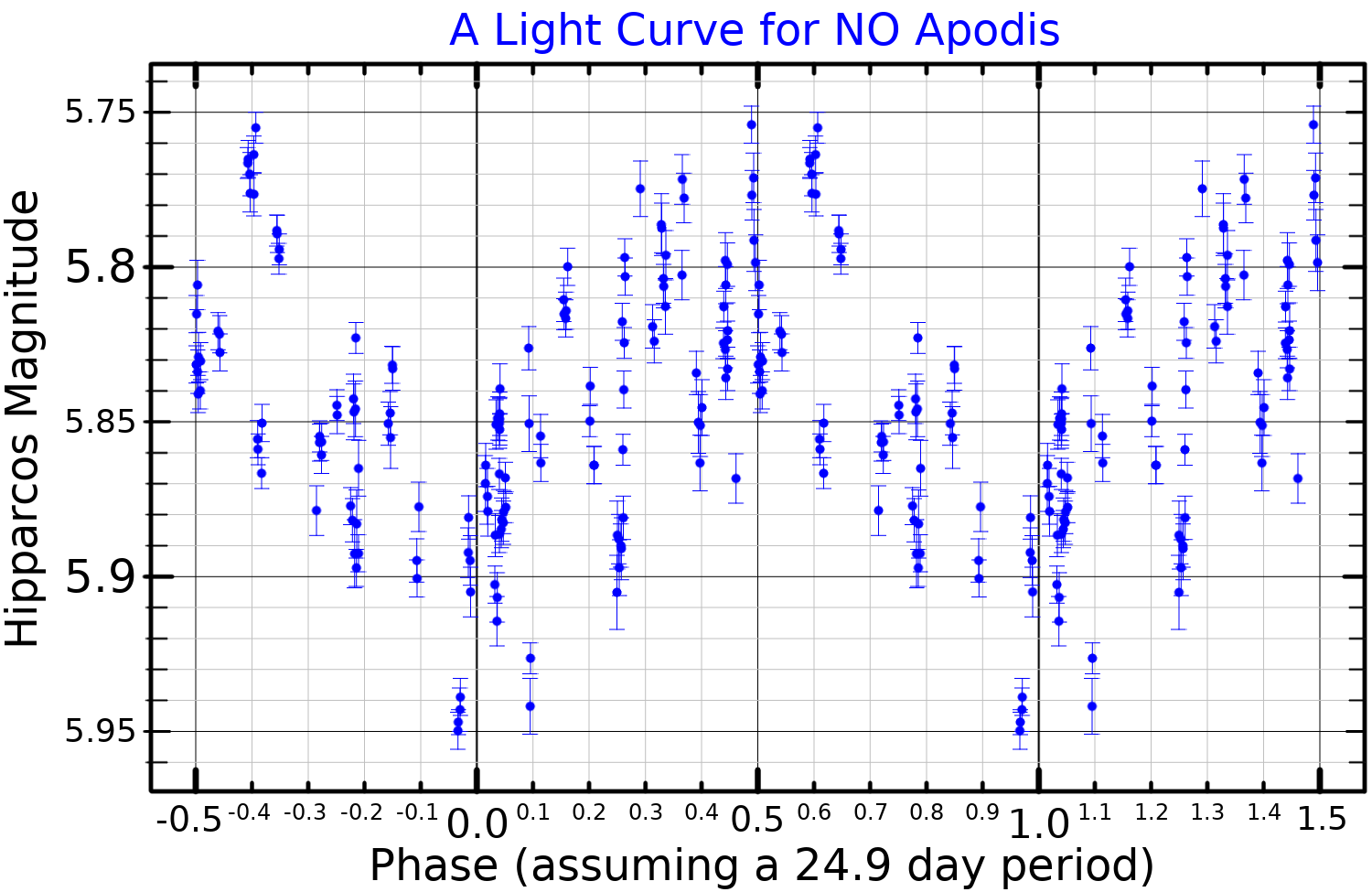
A light curve for NO Apodis, plotted from Hipparcos data. The data has been folded with the 24.9 day period listed in the International Variable Star Index.

NO Apodis has a stellar classification of M3 III, indicating that it is a red giant. It is currently on the asymptotic giant branch, fusing hydrogen and helium shells around an inert carbon core. At present it has 1.63 times the mass of the Sun and an enlarged radius of 107 R_{☉}. It shines with a bolometric luminosity 1,408 times that of the Sun from its photosphere at an effective temperature of 3,521 K.

NO Apodis is classified as a semiregular variable of unknown subtype. Observations from Tabur et al. (2009) reveal it to have two periods, both lasting 26-7 days. During this timeframe, the star flucates between 5.71 and 5.95 in the visual band.

Periods of NO Apodis
Period	Days	Amplitude
1	26.2	0.04
2	26.6	0.092
