= HD 134606 =

Star in the constellation Apus

Observation data Epoch J2000 Equinox ICRS
- Constellation: Apus
- Right ascension: 15^{h} 15^{m} 15.04464^{s}
- Declination: −70° 31′ 10.6449″
- Apparent magnitude (V): 6.86

Characteristics
- Evolutionary stage: subgiant
- Spectral type: G6 IV
- B−V color index: 0.740±0.001

Astrometry
Radial velocity (R_{v})	+1.94±0.12 km/s
Proper motion (μ)	RA: −177.871 mas/yr Dec.: −164.709 mas/yr
Parallax (π)	37.3020±0.0182 mas
Distance	87.44 ± 0.04 ly (26.81 ± 0.01 pc)
Absolute magnitude (M_{V})	4.74

Details
Mass	1.046+0.070 −0.059 M_{☉}
Radius	1.158+0.039 −0.036 R_{☉}
Luminosity	1.161+0.071 −0.049 L_{☉}
Surface gravity (log g)	4.330+0.044 −0.041 cgs
Temperature	5,576+86 −85 K
Metallicity [Fe/H]	+0.343+0.081 −0.084 dex
Rotation	42.0±3.9 d
Age	7.3+3.6 −3.4 Gyr

Other designations
- CD−70°1258, GC 20455, HD 134606, HIP 74653, SAO 257257, LTT 6064, 2MASS J15151504-7031105

Database references
SIMBAD	data
Exoplanet Archive	data

HD 134606 is a yellow-hued star with a planetary system, positioned in the southern constellation of Apus. It is below the nominal limit for visibility with the naked eye, having an apparent visual magnitude of 6.86. Based upon an annual parallax shift of 37.3 mas, it is located 87.44 light-years away. The star appears to be moving further from the Earth with a heliocentric radial velocity of +1.9 km/s.

This is an evolving G-type subgiant star with a stellar classification of G6 IV and is not considered magnetically active, having a chromospheric activity index of −5.04. It has about the same mass as the Sun but is 25% more luminous. The photosphere is radiating energy at an effective temperature of 5,614 K. It has a higher than solar metallicity – a term astronomers use to describe the abundance of elements other than hydrogen and helium.

There is a companion star of spectral type M3V at a separation of ~1500 AU, designated L 72-1. Analysis of its light curve indicate it is itself a close binary.

== Planetary system ==
The discovery of a planetary system orbiting HD 134606 was announced in 2011, following an eight-year survey carried out at the La Silla Observatory in Chile. The detection was made via the radial velocity method using the HARPS instrument. Applying a Keplerian fit to the data suggested the presence of three planets in moderately eccentric orbits. None of the planetary orbits displays a mean motion resonance with the others.

The system was updated by a 2024 study, which confirmed the three previously reported planets, though with a longer period for planet d, and detected two new ones. While all five planets are very likely to be real, the study advises caution regarding planet f due to the similarity of its period to the lunar cycle. The five planets range from super-Earth to super-Neptune mass, and the outermost, HD 134606 d, is a small gas giant orbiting within the habitable zone that may be a candidate for future space-based direct imaging missions. A long-period radial velocity trend was also detected, suggesting the presence of a distant sixth substellar companion.

The HD 134606 planetary system
Companion (in order from star)	Mass	Semimajor axis (AU)	Orbital period (days)	Eccentricity	Inclination (°)	Radius
e	≥2.34+0.35 −0.34 M_{🜨}	0.0527+0.0011 −0.0012	4.3203+0.00051 −0.00047	0.2+0.14 −0.13	—	—
b	≥9.09+0.64 −0.63 M_{🜨}	0.1046+0.0023 −0.0024	12.089+0.0016 −0.0015	0.092+0.054 −0.053	—	—
f	≥5.63+0.72 −0.69 M_{🜨}	0.1784+0.0039 −0.0041	26.915±0.016	0.081+0.1 −0.059	—	—
c	≥11.31+1.0 −0.99 M_{🜨}	0.3007+0.0066 −0.0069	58.883+0.041 −0.039	0.055+0.062 −0.04	—	—
d	≥44.8±2.9 M_{🜨}	1.941+0.043 −0.046	966.5+5.3 −6.9	0.092±0.045	—	—
