= S Apodis =

Variable star in the constellation Apus

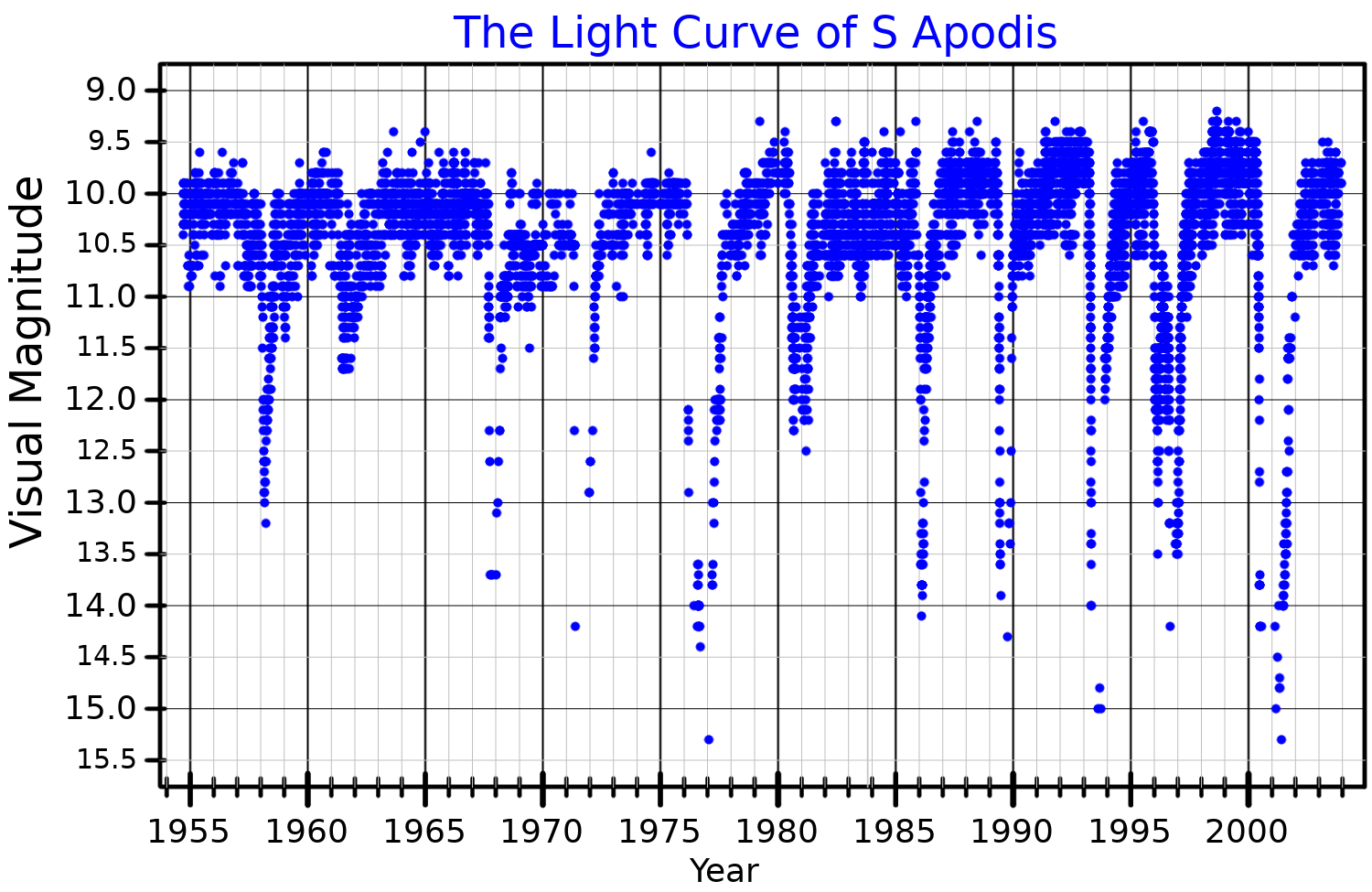
- The visual band light curve of S Apodis, from AAVSO data

Observation data Epoch J2000.0 Equinox ICRS
- Constellation: Apus
- Right ascension: 15^{h} 09^{m} 24.53660^{s}
- Declination: −72° 03′ 45.1828″
- Apparent magnitude (V): 9.6 - 17.0

Characteristics
- Evolutionary stage: post-AGB
- Spectral type: R3
- U−B color index: +0.66
- B−V color index: +1.26
- Variable type: R Coronae Borealis

Astrometry
| Radial velocity (R_{v}) | −75.0 km/s |
| Proper motion (μ) | RA: −6.632 mas/yr Dec.: −2.155 mas/yr |
| Parallax (π) | 0.2243±0.0171 mas |
| Distance | 15,000 ± 1,000 ly (4,500 ± 300 pc) |
| Absolute bolometric magnitude (M_{bol}) | −2.68 (at max) |

Details
| Mass | 0.6 or 1 M_{☉} |
| Radius | 132±9 R_{☉} |
| Luminosity | 960 L_{☉} |
| Temperature | 4,500 - 5,115 K |

Other designations
- S Aps, CD−71°1120, CPD−71°1743, HD 133444, HIP 74179, 2MASS J15092452-7203451

Database references
| SIMBAD | data |

S Apodis, also known as HD 133444, is a variable star located in the southern circumpolar constellation Apus. It has an apparent magnitude ranging from 9.6 to 17, which is below the limit for naked eye visibility. The object is located relatively far at a distance of approximately 15,000 light years based on Gaia DR3 parallax measurements, but it is drifting closer with a heliocentric radial velocity of −75 km/s.

HD 133444 was discovered to be a variable star by Williamina Fleming, who examined images of the star on 58 photographic plates taken from 1889 through 1895. The discovery was announced in 1896. Annie Jump Cannon included the star, with its variable star designation S Apodis, in her 1907 Second Catalogue of Variable Stars. However, its nature as a carbon star was not observed until 1967 by astronomer Brian Warner. In 1973, HD 133444 was listed as a R Coronae Borealis variable. These are extremely hydrogen-deficient supergiants thought to have arisen as the result of the merger of two white dwarfs and fewer than 100 have been discovered as of 2013. A decade later, S Apodis was observed to have a change it its pulsation mode.

S Apodis has a stellar classification of R3, indicating that it is a R-type carbon star. It has a mass of either 0.6 M_{☉} or 1 M_{☉}, depending on the model. However, it has expanded to an average radius 132 times that of the Sun. It radiates 960 times the luminosity of the Sun from its photosphere at an effective temperature of 4,500–5,115 K, giving it an orange hue. An infrared excess has been detected around the star, indicating the presence of circumstellar dust. The dust has a temperature of 730 K.
