= Theta Apodis =

Star in the constellation Apus

θ Apodis
- Location of θ Apodis (circled)

Observation data Epoch J2000 Equinox ICRS
- Constellation: Apus
- Right ascension: 14^{h} 05^{m} 19.881^{s}
- Declination: −76° 47′ 48.34″
- Apparent magnitude (V): 4.65 - 6.20

Characteristics
- Evolutionary stage: AGB
- Spectral type: M7 III
- U−B color index: +1.07
- B−V color index: +1.48
- Variable type: SRb

Astrometry
Radial velocity (R_{v})	+9.0 km/s
Proper motion (μ)	RA: −88.586 mas/yr Dec.: −32.655 mas/yr
Parallax (π)	8.3808±0.3574 mas
Distance	390 ± 20 ly (119 ± 5 pc)
Absolute magnitude (M_{V})	0.7

Details
Mass	1.0±0.3 M_{☉}
Radius	208 R_{☉}
Luminosity	3,050±460 L_{☉}
Surface gravity (log g)	+0.0 cgs
Temperature	2,850±160 K
Metallicity [Fe/H]	−0.20 dex

Other designations
- θ Apodis, Theta Aps, AAVSO 1355-76, CD−76°615, FK5 1363, HD 122250, HIP 68815, HR 5261, SAO 257112

Database references
SIMBAD	data

Theta Apodis is a variable star in the southern circumpolar constellation of Apus. Its identifier is a Bayer designation that is Latinized from θ Apodis, and abbreviated Tet Aps or θ Aps, respectively. This is a variable star with an apparent visual magnitude range of 4.65 to 6.20, which, according to the Bortle Dark-Sky Scale, means it is a faint star but visible to the naked eye from dark suburban skies. The distance to Theta Apodis is approximately 390 light-years (120 parsecs), based upon parallax measurements made from the Gaia telescope. It is unusual in that it is a red star with a high proper motion (greater than 50 milliarcseconds a year).

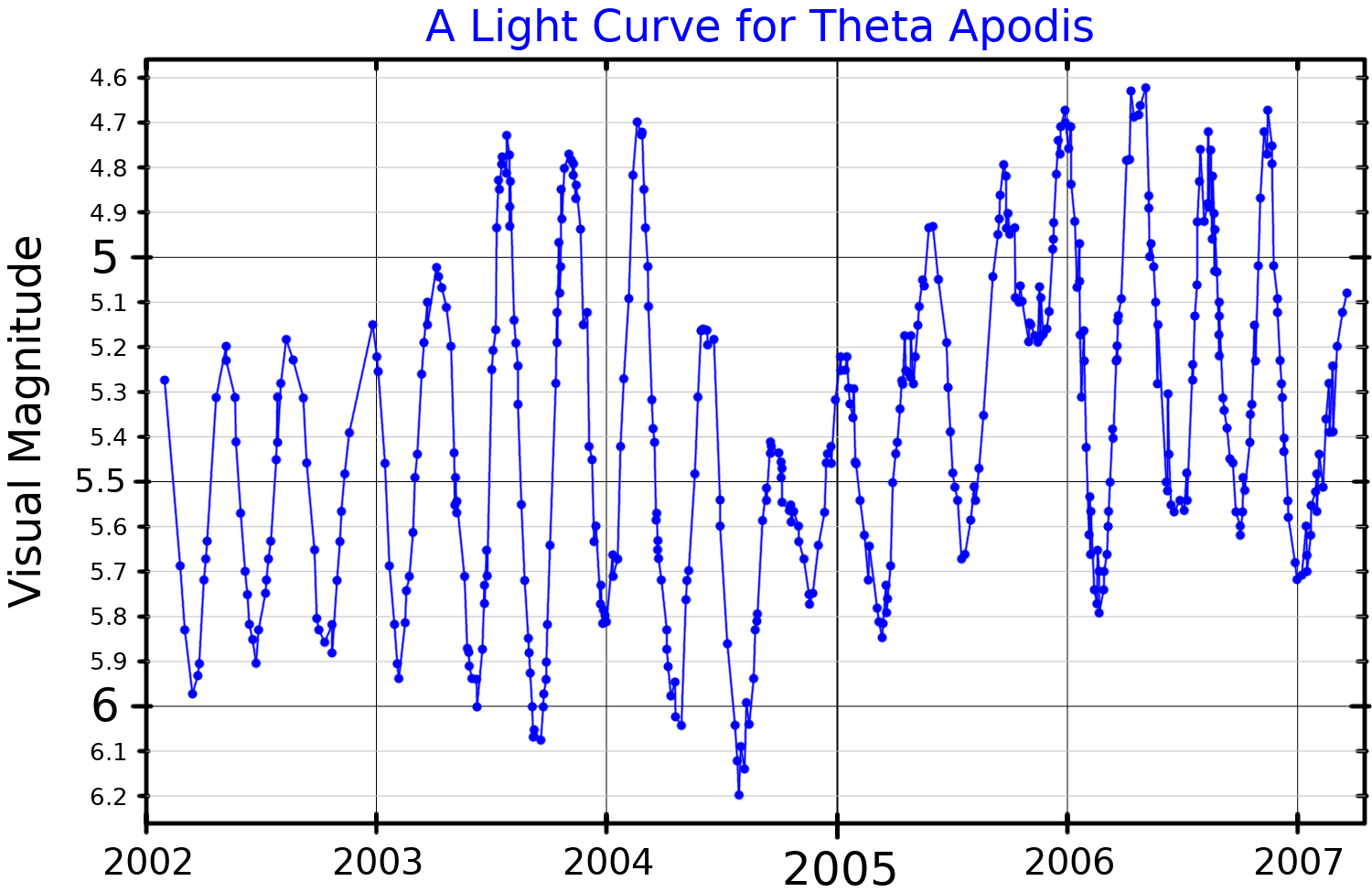
A light curve for Theta Apodis, adapted from Moon et al. (2008)

Benjamin Apthorp Gould announced that Theta Apodis is a variable star, in 1879. It is a semiregular pulsating variable and its brightness changes over a range of 0.56 magnitudes with a period of 119 days. A longer period of around 1,000 days has also been detected.

This is an evolved red giant that is currently on the asymptotic giant branch, with a stellar classification of M7 III. It shines with a luminosity approximately 3879 times that of the Sun and has a surface temperature of 3,131 K. It is losing mass at the rate of 1.1 × 10^{−7} times the mass of the Sun per year through its stellar wind. Dusty material ejected from this star is interacting with the surrounding interstellar medium, forming a bow shock as the star moves through the galaxy. The stand-off distance for this front is located at about 0.134 ly (0.041 pc) from Theta Apodis.

Theta Apodis has been identified as an astrometric binary, indicating that it has an orbiting companion that causes gravitational perturbation of the primary star.
