= HD 137388 =

Star in the constellation Apus

HD 137388 / Karaka
Observation data Epoch J2000.0 Equinox ICRS
- Constellation: Apus
- Right ascension: 15^{h} 35^{m} 39.922^{s}
- Declination: −80° 12′ 16.54″
- Apparent magnitude (V): 8.70

Characteristics
- Evolutionary stage: subgiant
- Spectral type: K2IV or K0/K1V
- B−V color index: 0.891±0.017

Astrometry
Radial velocity (R_{v})	+26.15±0.14 km/s
Proper motion (μ)	RA: −49.722 mas/yr Dec.: +41.094 mas/yr
Parallax (π)	24.6160±0.0128 mas
Distance	132.50 ± 0.07 ly (40.62 ± 0.02 pc)
Absolute magnitude (M_{V})	5.75

Details
Mass	0.930+0.024 −0.035 M_{☉}
Radius	0.86±0.01 R_{☉}
Luminosity	0.528 L_{☉}
Surface gravity (log g)	4.449±0.434 cgs
Temperature	5,297±20 K
Metallicity [Fe/H]	+0.29 dex
Rotational velocity (v sin i)	2.207±0.356 km/s
Age	2.991+2.629 −1.902 Gyr

Other designations
- Karaka, NSV 7116, CPD–79°844, HD 137388, HIP 76351, 2MASS J15353994-8012164, Gaia DR2 5778418870846853888

Database references
SIMBAD	data

HD 137388 is an orange-hued star in the southern constellation of Apus. It has the proper name Karaka, after the native New Zealand karaka tree. The name was assigned by representatives of New Zealand in the IAU's NameExoWorlds contest. The star is too faint to be visible to the naked eye, having an apparent visual magnitude of 8.70. It is located at a distance of 132 light years from the Sun based on parallax. The star is drifting further away with a radial velocity of +26 km/s, having come as close as 52.9 light-years some 1.2 million years ago. It has an absolute magnitude of 5.75.

The stellar classification of HD 137388 is K2IV, matching that of an evolving subgiant star. However, in 2011 Dumusque and colleagues found a class of K0/K1V, suggesting it is instead a K-type main-sequence star. It is around three billion years old and is spinning with a projected rotational velocity of 2.2 km/s. The star shows a magnetic activity cycle, similar to the solar cycle. It has 93% of the mass of the Sun and 86% of the Sun's radius. Based on the abundance of iron in the spectrum, it is a high metallicity star with a greater abundance of heavy elements compared to the Sun. The star is radiating 53% of the luminosity of the Sun from its photosphere at an effective temperature of 5,297 K.

== Planetary system ==
Radial velocity studies indicate that it has a planet, originally named HD 137388 b (mass 0.223 MJ, period 330d). It orbits at a typical distance of 0.89 AU with an eccentricity of 0.36, completely overlapping the star's habitable zone. The planet was officially designated Kererū, the Māori name of the New Zealand pigeon, by the IAU in the same contest that named its parent star.

The HD 137388 planetary system
Companion (in order from star)	Mass	Semimajor axis (AU)	Orbital period (days)	Eccentricity	Inclination (°)	Radius
b (Kererū)	0.223±0.029 M_{J}	0.89±0.02	330.0±4.0	0.36±0.12	86.0±35.0	—
