= Apus =

Constellation in the southern celestial hemisphere

- Constellation
- List of stars in Apus
- Abbreviation: Aps
- Genitive: Apodis
- Pronunciation: /ˈeɪpəs/, genitive /ˈeɪpə, ˈæpə, əˈpoʊ-dɪs/
- Symbolism: The Bird-of-Paradise
- Right ascension: 13^{h} 51^{m} 07.5441^{s} – 18^{h} 27^{m} 27.8395^{s}
- Declination: −67.4800797° to −83.1200714°
- Area: 206 sq. deg. (67th)
- Main stars: 4
- Bayer/Flamsteed stars: 12
- Stars brighter than 3.00^{m}: 0
- Stars within 10.00 pc (32.62 ly): 0
- Brightest star: α Aps (Paradys) (3.83^{m})
- Nearest star: L 43-72
- Messier objects: 0
- Meteor showers: 0
- Bordering constellations: Triangulum Australe; Circinus; Musca; Chamaeleon; Octans; Pavo; Ara
- Visible at latitudes between +5° and −90°. Best visible at 21:00 (9 p.m.) during the month of July.

Apus is a small constellation in the southern sky. It represents a bird-of-paradise, and its name means "without feet" in Greek because the bird-of-paradise was once wrongly believed to lack feet. First depicted on a celestial globe by Petrus Plancius in 1598, it was charted on a star atlas by Johann Bayer in his 1603 Uranometria. The French explorer and astronomer Nicolas Louis de Lacaille charted and gave the brighter stars their Bayer designations in 1756.

The five brightest stars are all reddish in hue. Shading the others at apparent magnitude 3.8 is Alpha Apodis (formally named Paradys), an orange giant that has around 48 times the diameter and 928 times the luminosity of the Sun. Marginally fainter is Gamma Apodis, another aging giant star. Delta Apodis is a double star, the two components of which are 103 arcseconds apart and visible with the naked eye. Two star systems have been found to have planets.

== History ==
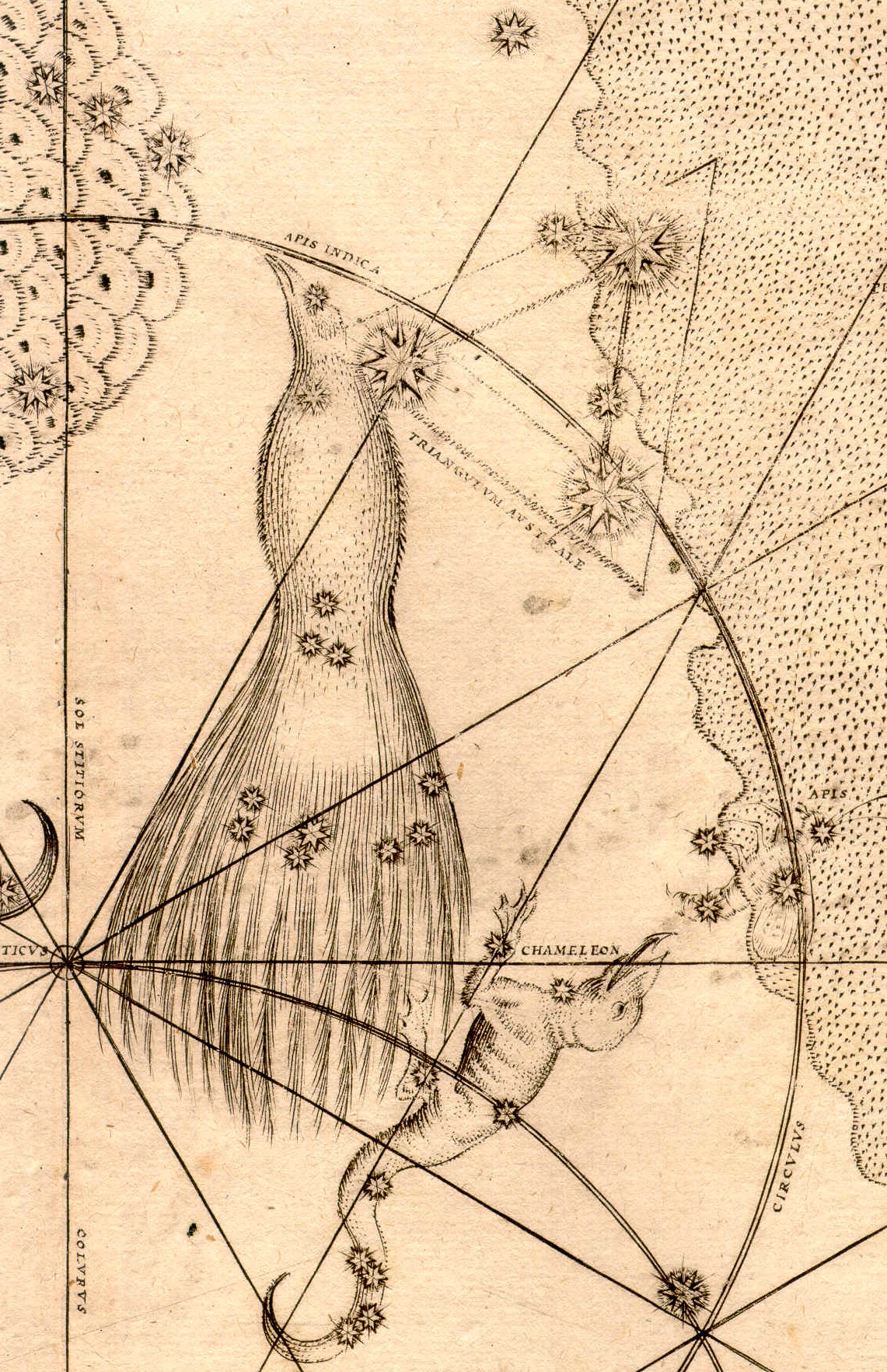
Detail of Johann Bayer's 1603 Uranometria, showing the constellations Apus, Chamaeleon, Musca (as "Apis", the Bee), and Triangulum Australe, as well as the South celestial pole.

Apus was one of twelve constellations published by Petrus Plancius from the observations of Pieter Dirkszoon Keyser and Frederick de Houtman who had sailed on the first Dutch trading expedition, known as the Eerste Schipvaart, to the East Indies. It first appeared on a 35-cm (14 in) diameter celestial globe published in 1598 in Amsterdam by Plancius with Jodocus Hondius. De Houtman included it in his southern star catalogue in 1603 under the Dutch name De Paradijs Voghel, "The Bird of Paradise", and Plancius called the constellation Paradysvogel Apis Indica; the first word is Dutch for "bird of paradise". Apis (Latin for "bee") is assumed to have been a typographical error for avis ("bird").

After its introduction on Plancius's globe, the constellation's first known appearance in a celestial atlas was in German cartographer Johann Bayer's Uranometria of 1603. Bayer called it Apis Indica while fellow astronomers Johannes Kepler and his son-in-law Jakob Bartsch called it Apus or Avis Indica. The name Apus is derived from the Greek apous, meaning "without feet". This referred to the Western misconception that the bird-of-paradise had no feet, which arose because the only specimens available in the West had their feet and wings removed. Such specimens began to arrive in Europe in 1522, when the survivors of Ferdinand Magellan's expedition brought them home. The constellation later lost some of its tail when Nicolas-Louis de Lacaille used those stars to establish Octans in the 1750s.

== Characteristics ==
Covering 206.3 square degrees and hence 0.5002% of the sky, Apus ranks 67th of the 88 modern constellations by area. Its position in the Southern Celestial Hemisphere means that the whole constellation is visible to observers south of 7°N. (Note: While parts of the constellation technically rise above the horizon to observers between the 7°N and 22°N, stars within a few degrees of the horizon are to all intents and purposes unobservable.) It is bordered by Ara, Triangulum Australe and Circinus to the north, Musca and Chamaeleon to the west, Octans to the south, and Pavo to the east. The three-letter abbreviation for the constellation, as adopted by the International Astronomical Union in 1922, is "Aps". The official constellation boundaries, as set by Belgian astronomer Eugène Delporte in 1930, (Note: Delporte had proposed standardising the constellation boundaries to the International Astronomical Union, who had agreed and gave him the lead role.) are defined by a polygon of six segments (illustrated in infobox). In the equatorial coordinate system, the right ascension coordinates of these borders lie between 13^{h} 49.5^{m} and 18^{h} 27.3^{m} , while the declination coordinates are between −67.48° and −83.12°.

== Features ==
=== Stars ===
Lacaille gave twelve stars Bayer designations, labelling them Alpha through to Kappa, including two stars next to each other as Delta and another two stars near each other as Kappa. Within the constellation's borders, there are 39 stars brighter than or equal to apparent magnitude 6.5. (Note: Objects of magnitude 6.5 are among the faintest visible to the unaided eye in suburban-rural transition night skies.) Beta, Gamma and Delta Apodis form a narrow triangle, with Alpha Apodis (proper name is Paradys since 18 May 2025) lying to the east. The five brightest stars are all red-tinged, which is unusual among constellations.

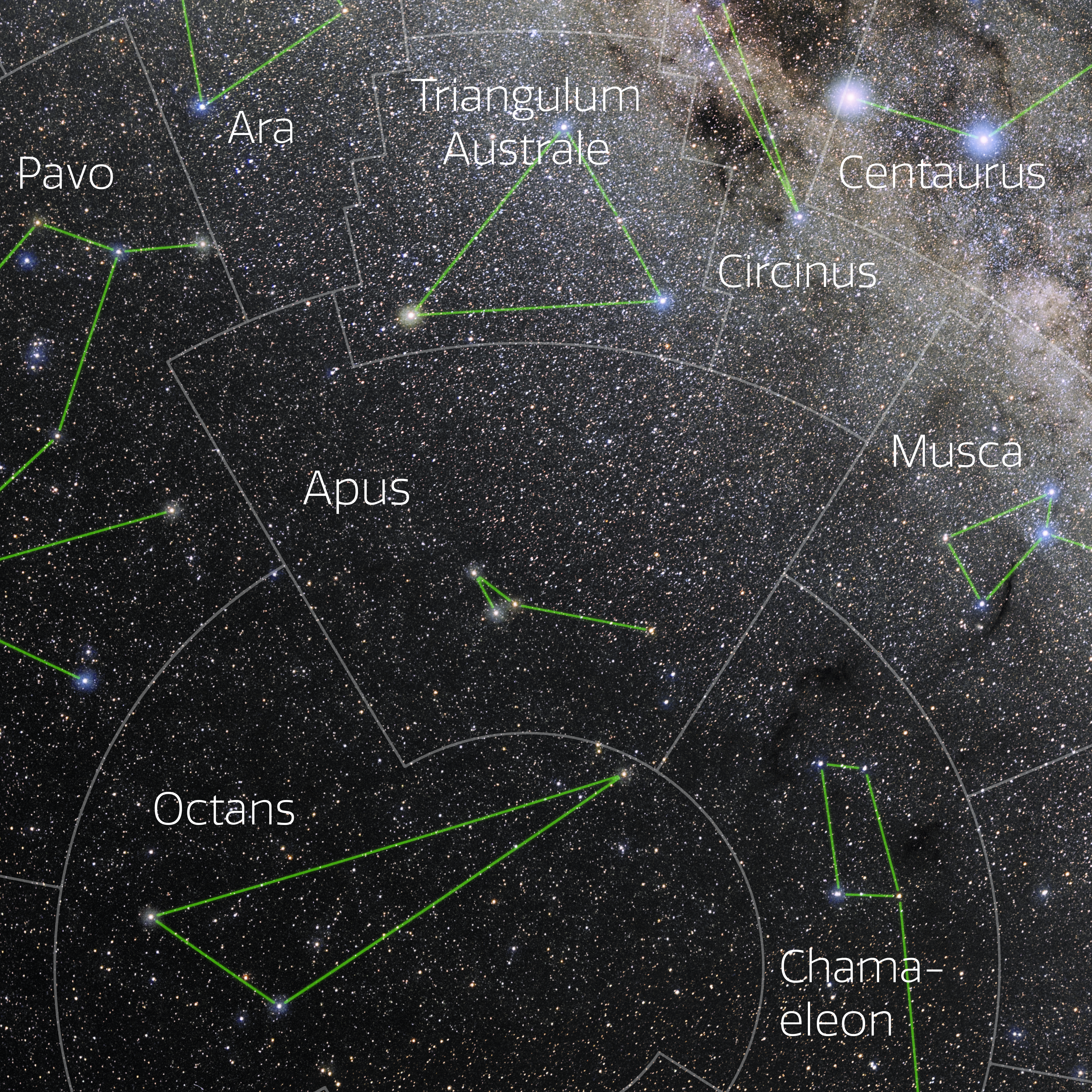
The constellation Apus showing the IAU boundaries, the constellation stick figure, and labels for its brightest stars. Astrophotograph by Eckhard Slawik, from NOIRLab's 88 Constellations project.

Alpha Apodis (formally named Paradys) is an orange giant of spectral type K3III located 430 ± 20 light-years away from Earth, with an apparent magnitude of 3.8. It spent much of its life as a blue-white (B-type) main sequence star before expanding, cooling and brightening as it used up its core hydrogen. It has swollen to 48 times the Sun's diameter, and shines with a luminosity approximately 928 times that of the Sun, with a surface temperature of 4312 K. Beta Apodis is an orange giant 149 ± 2 light-years away, with a magnitude of 4.2. It is around 1.84 times as massive as the Sun, with a surface temperature of 4677 K. Gamma Apodis is a yellow giant of spectral type G8III located 150 ± 4 light-years away, with a magnitude of 3.87. It is approximately 63 times as luminous the Sun, with a surface temperature of 5279 K. Delta Apodis is a double star, the two components of which are 103 arcseconds apart and visible through binoculars. Delta^{1} is a red giant star of spectral type M4III located 630 ± 30 light-years away. It is a semiregular variable that varies from magnitude +4.66 to +4.87, with pulsations of multiple periods of 68.0, 94.9 and 101.7 days. Delta^{2} is an orange giant star of spectral type K3III, located 550 ± 10 light-years away, with a magnitude of 5.3. The separate components can be resolved with the naked eye.

The fifth-brightest star is Zeta Apodis at magnitude 4.8, a star that has swollen and cooled to become an orange giant of spectral type K1III, with a surface temperature of 4649 K and a luminosity 133 times that of the Sun. It is 300 ± 4 light-years distant. Near Zeta is Iota Apodis, a binary star system 1,040 ± 60 light-years distant, that is composed of two blue-white main sequence stars that orbit each other every 59.32 years. Of spectral types B9V and B9.5 V, they are both over three times as massive as the Sun.

Eta Apodis is a white main sequence star located 140.8 ± 0.9 light-years distant. Of apparent magnitude 4.89, it is 1.77 times as massive, 15.5 times as luminous as the Sun and has 2.13 times its radius. Aged 250 ± 200 million years old, this star is emitting an excess of 24 μm infrared radiation, which may be caused by a debris disk of dust orbiting at a distance of more than 31 astronomical units from it.

Theta Apodis is a cool red giant of spectral type M7 III located 350 ± 30 light-years distant. It shines with a luminosity approximately 3879 times that of the Sun and has a surface temperature of 3151 K. A semiregular variable, it varies by 0.56 magnitudes with a period of 119 days—or approximately 4 months. It is losing mass at the rate of 1.1 × 10^{−7} times the mass of the Sun per year through its stellar wind. Dusty material ejected from this star is interacting with the surrounding interstellar medium, forming a bow shock as the star moves through the galaxy. NO Apodis is a red giant of spectral type M3III that varies between magnitudes 5.71 and 5.95. Located 780 ± 20 light-years distant, it shines with a luminosity estimated at 2059 times that of the Sun and has a surface temperature of 3568 K. S Apodis is a rare R Coronae Borealis variable, an extremely hydrogen-deficient supergiant thought to have arisen as the result of the merger of two white dwarfs; fewer than 100 have been discovered as of 2012. It has a baseline magnitude of 9.7. R Apodis is a star that was given a variable star designation, yet has turned out not to be variable. Of magnitude 5.3, it is another orange giant.

Two star systems have had exoplanets discovered by doppler spectroscopy, and the substellar companion of a third star system—the sunlike star HD 131664—has since been found to be a brown dwarf with a calculated mass of the companion to 23 times that of Jupiter (minimum of 18 and maximum of 49 Jovian masses). HD 134606 is a yellow sunlike star of spectral type G6IV that has begun expanding and cooling off the main sequence. Three planets orbit it with periods of 12, 59.5 and 459 days, successively larger as they are further away from the star. HD 137388 is another star—of spectral type K2IV—that is cooler than the Sun and has begun cooling off the main sequence. Around 47% as luminous and 88% as massive as the Sun, with 85% of its diameter, it is thought to be around 7.4 ± 3.9 billion years old. It has a planet that is 79 times as massive as the Earth and orbits its sun every 330 days at an average distance of 0.89 astronomical units (AU).

=== Deep-sky objects ===
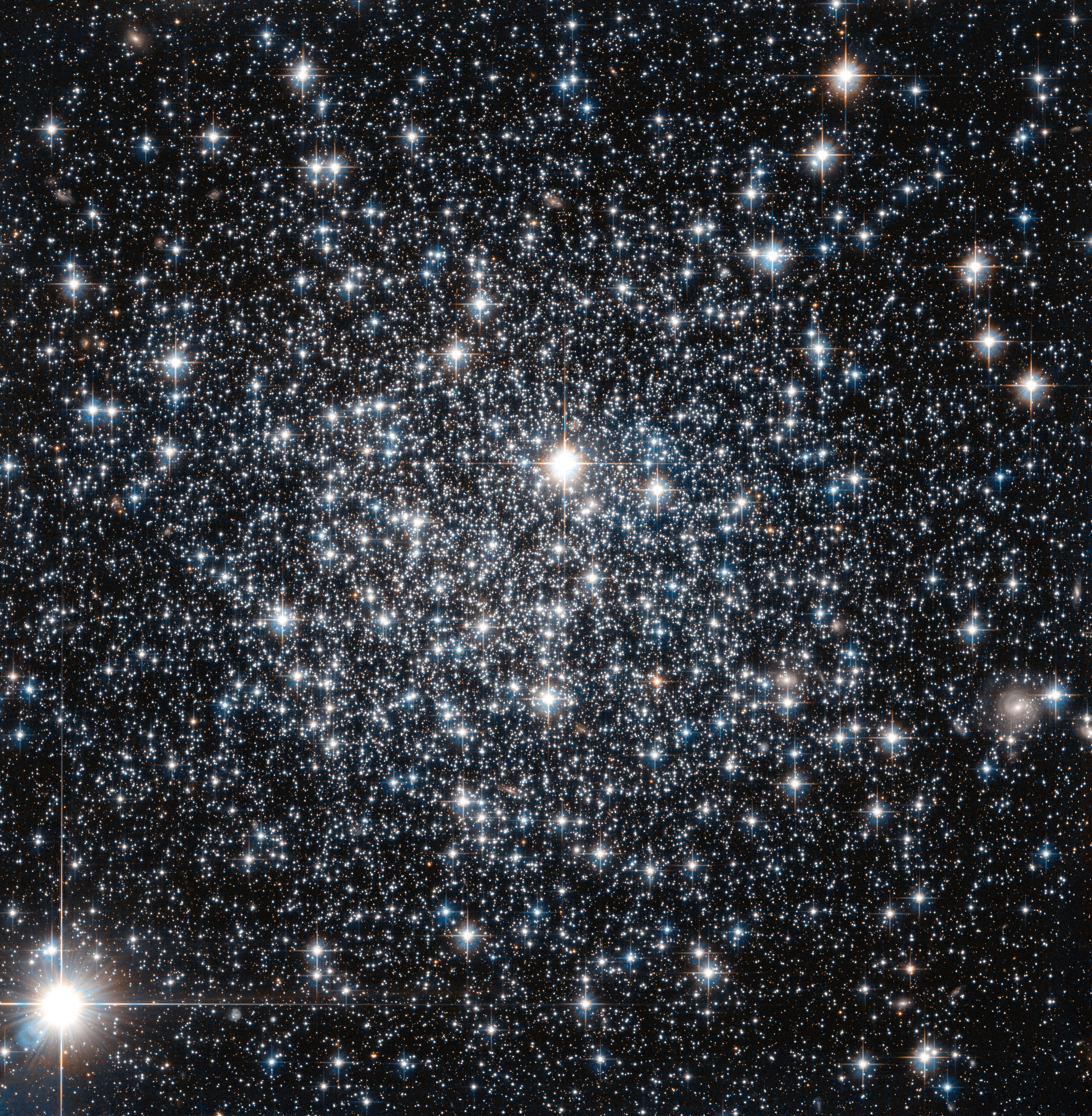
Globular cluster IC 4499 taken by Hubble Space Telescope.

The Milky Way covers much of the constellation's area. Of the deep-sky objects in Apus, there are two prominent globular clusters—NGC 6101 and IC 4499—and a large faint nebula that covers several degrees east of Beta and Gamma Apodis. NGC 6101 is a globular cluster of apparent magnitude 9.2 located around 50,000 light-years distant from Earth, which is around 160 light-years across. Around 13 billion years old, it contains a high concentration of massive bright stars known as blue stragglers, thought to be the result of two stars merging. IC 4499 is a loose globular cluster in the medium-far galactic halo; its apparent magnitude is 10.6.

The galaxies in the constellation are faint. IC 4633 is a very faint spiral galaxy surrounded by a vast amount of Milky Way line-of-sight integrated flux nebulae—large faint clouds thought to be lit by large numbers of stars.

== See also ==
- IAU-recognized constellations
