= NGC 80 =

Lenticular galaxy in the constellation Andromeda

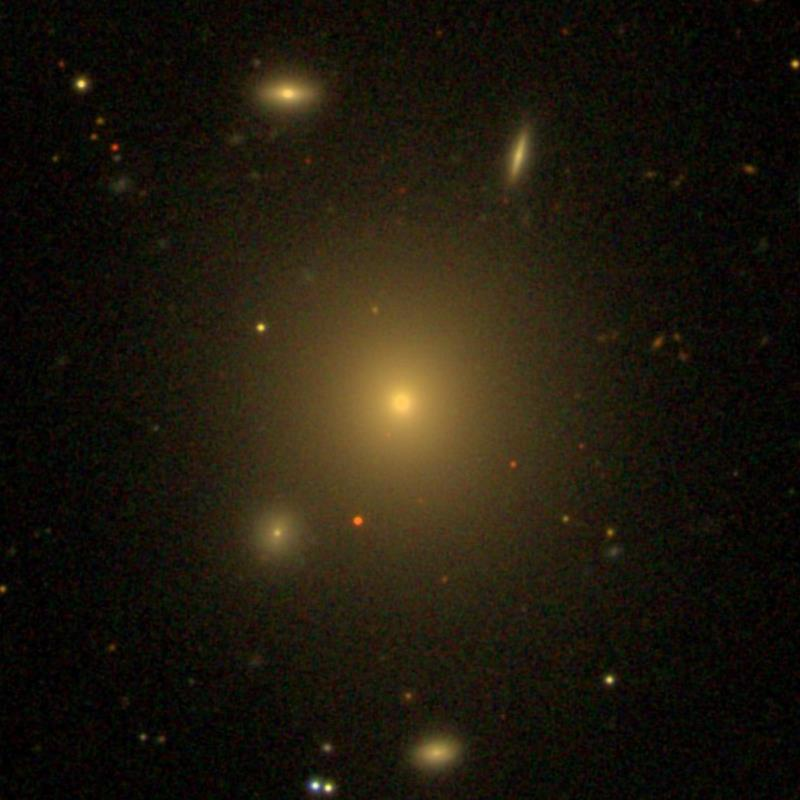
- SDSS image of NGC 80

Observation data (J2000 epoch)
- Constellation: Andromeda
- Right ascension: 00^{h} 21^{m} 10.865^{s}
- Declination: +22° 21′ 26.11″
- Redshift: 0.019006
- Heliocentric radial velocity: 5698
- Distance: 260.76 ± 66.60 Mly (79.950 ± 20.421 Mpc)
- Group or cluster: NGC 80 group
- Apparent magnitude (V): 12.07
- Apparent magnitude (B): 13.7
- Absolute magnitude (V): −22.38

Characteristics
- Type: SA0^{−}
- Size: 166,900 ly (51,160 pc)
- Apparent size (V): 2.2′ × 2.002′

Other designations
- UGC 203, MCG+04-02-004, PGC 1351

NGC 80 is a lenticular galaxy located in the constellation Andromeda. It is currently interacting with two other barred spiral galaxies NGC 47 and NGC 68, and was discovered on August 17, 1828, by John Herschel.

== Physical properties ==
NGC 80 is classified as a giant lenticular galaxy. Its circumnuclear ring measured 5″t 7″ in radius, is 7 billion years with an older stellar population of 10 billion years. The galaxy also has a metal-rich chemically distinct nucleus.

== NGC 80 group ==
NGC 80 is the brightest cluster galaxy of the NGC 80 group, a galaxy group named after it. Other galaxies that forms the group are NGC 79, NGC 81, NGC 83, NGC 85, NGC 86, Arp 65 (NGC 90 and NGC 93, NGC 94, NGC 96, IC 1542 and IC 1546.

According to astronomers who studied the budges of seven members in the NGC 80 group in 2008 using the BTA-6 telescope, they discovered the stars have an estimated age of between 10 and 15 billion years old. However, IC 1548 (another member of the NGC 80 group) was exceptional since it showed signs of recent star formations, with a budge and nucleus age calculated to be 3 and 1.5 billion years respectively. Moreover, IC 1548 also has a thin-like gas structure indicating its interaction caused it to become a lenticular galaxy.

The following year, the same telescope was used, this time to observe 13 disk galaxies in the group. Of the 13 galaxies, 9 were lenticulars. Astronomers also found there is one case of ongoing star formation in UCM 0018+2216 and that all galaxies studied exhibited a two-layered stellar disk brighter than M B ~ -18.

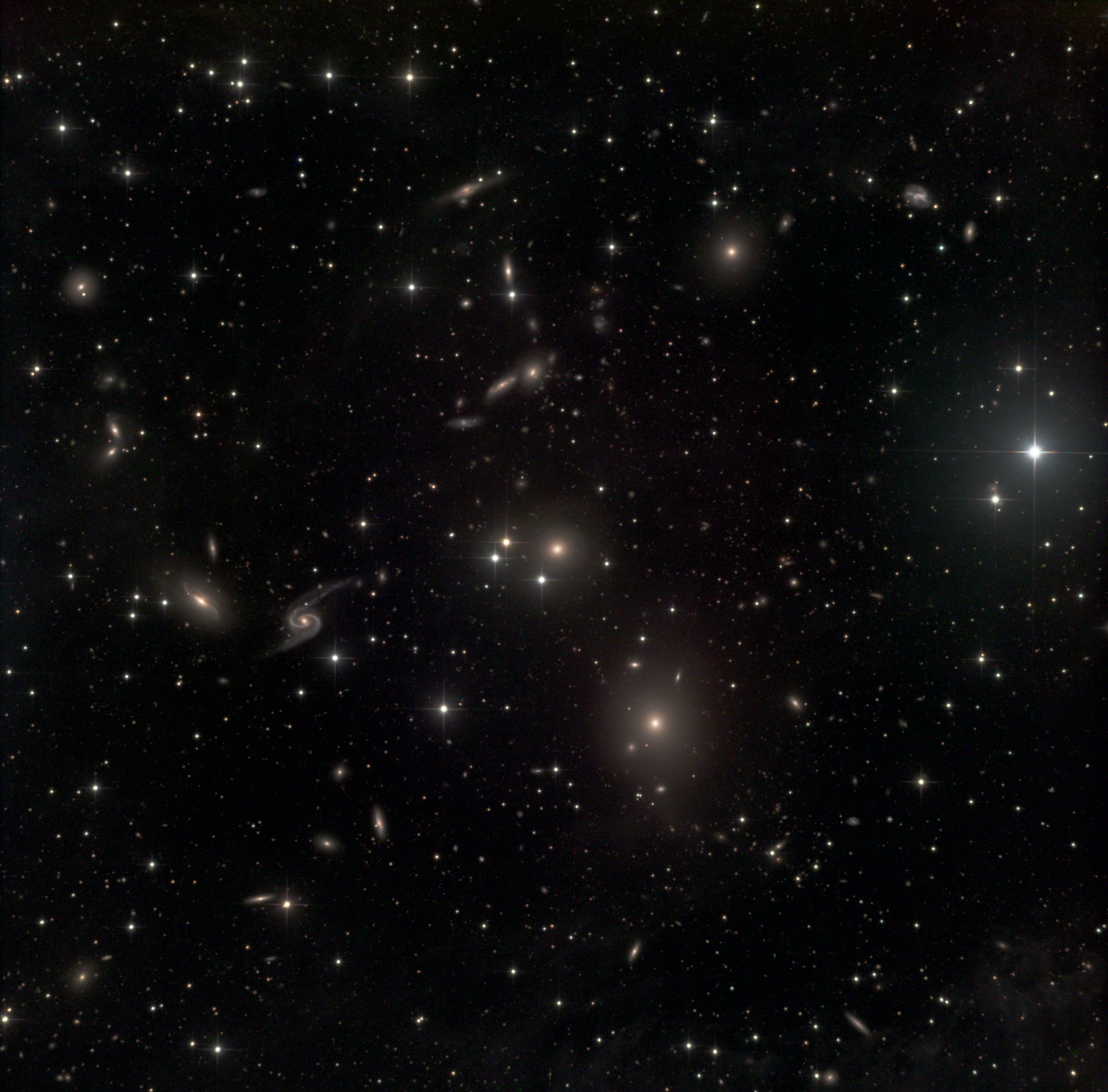
Image of the NGC 80 group taken by amateur astronomers at the Observatory of Saint-Veran.
