= NGC 67 =

Galaxy in the constellation Andromeda

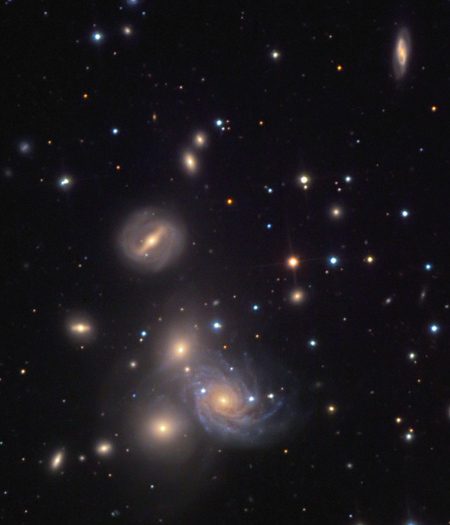
- NGC 67 (red arrow) and NGC 67a to the right, within the NGC 68 group

Observation data (J2000 epoch)
- Constellation: Andromeda
- Right ascension: 00^{h} 18^{m} 12.2^{s}
- Declination: +30° 03′ 20″
- Redshift: 0.020734
- Heliocentric radial velocity: 6216 km/s
- Distance: 275,000,000 ly
- Group or cluster: NGC 68 group
- Apparent magnitude (V): 14.2

Characteristics
- Type: E5
- Size: 40,000
- Apparent size (V): 24" x 12"

Other designations
- PGC 138159

NGC 67a
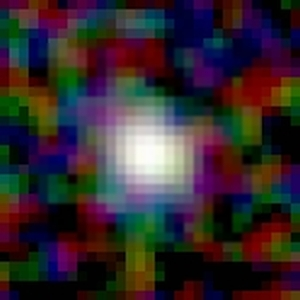
- image of NGC 67a from the 2MASS survey

Observation data (J2000 epoch)
- Constellation: Andromeda
- Right ascension: 00^{h} 18^{m} 14.8^{s}
- Declination: +30° 03′ 47″
- Redshift: 0.022162
- Heliocentric radial velocity: 6644 km/s
- Distance: 300,000,000 ly
- Group or cluster: NGC 68 group
- Apparent magnitude (V): 14.5

Characteristics
- Type: E3
- Size: 35,000
- Apparent size (V): 0.49′ × 0.331′

Other designations
- PGC 1185

NGC 67 is an elliptical galaxy located in the constellation Andromeda that was discovered on October 7, 1855, by R. J. Mitchell, who described it as "extremely faint, very small, round". The galaxy belongs to the NGC 68 group, which also contains the galaxies NGC 68, NGC 69, NGC 70, NGC 71, NGC 72, and possibly NGC 74.

== Target galaxy controversy ==
Mitchell's position locates the observed galaxy between an E3 elliptical and an E5 elliptical on the edge of the galaxy group, and each elliptical has been interpreted as the original and secondary. Wikisky lists the round galaxy as the primary and the elongated as PGC 138159, the Deep-Sky Objects browser lists the elongated as NGC 67, NED lists the same galaxy as both NGC 67 and NGC 67a. Courtney Seligman's NGC object database argues, however, that since the location offset of NGC 67 is similar to that of the other galaxies in the group, that the elongated galaxy is likely the observed object, and that the rounder NGC 67a was listed as a star by Mitchell.

== See also ==
- NGC
- List of NGC objects (1–1000)
- List of NGC objects
- Galaxy
