= NGC 68 Group =

Galaxy group in the constellation Andromeda

VV 166 (NGC 68 Group)
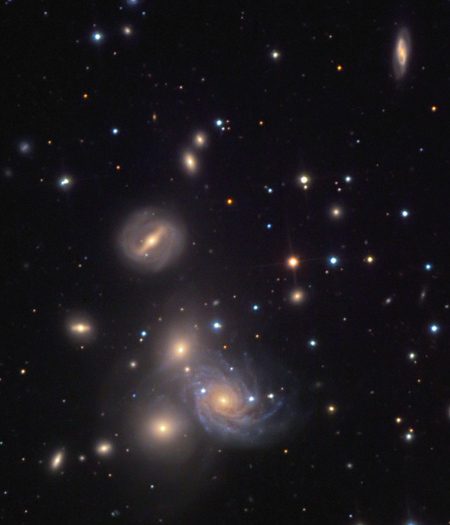

Observation data (Epoch )
- Constellation: Andromeda
- Right ascension: main group 00^{h} 18^{m} 30^{s} cluster center 00^{h} 18^{m} 45^{s}
- Declination: main group 30° 03′ 00″ cluster center 30° 00′ 00″
- Number of galaxies: 40 (confirmed); 60+ (possible)
- Richness class: Group 0/1
- Bautz–Morgan classification: type II/III
- Velocity dispersion: ~6750
- Redshift: 0.019 to 0.025
- Distance: ~300 Mly

Other designations
- [M98j] 003, VV 166, RSCG 01, WBL 007, USCG U012, RASSCALS SRGb 062, PCC S34-115, HOLM 006, SRGb 062, DOC SRGb 062, WP 01, PPS2 060, HDCE 0011

VV 166, sometimes also called the NGC 70 Group or Arp 113, is a galaxy group in Andromeda. The main group was discovered in 1784 by William Herschel, who listed the galaxies as a single object. Later, in the 1880s, John Louis Emil Dreyer managed to discern some of the galaxies in this region and cataloged them. The prominent elliptical galaxy in the region, NGC 68, is probably not a member of the group.

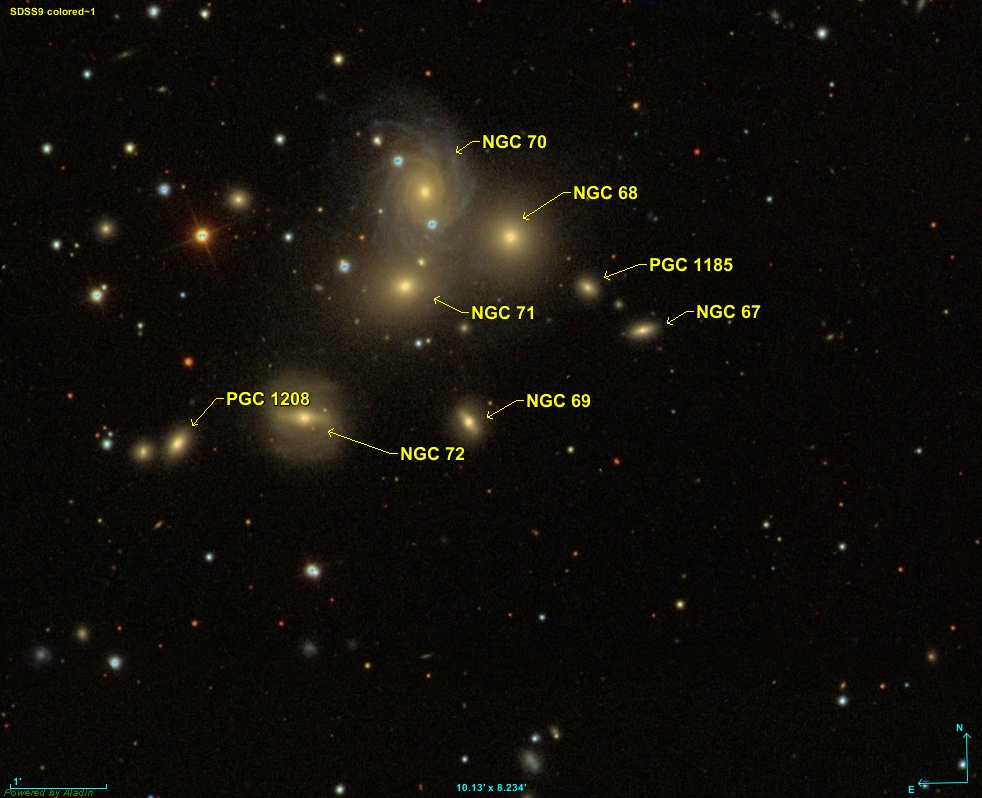
The galaxy group with labels

Superimposed on the group is a smaller cluster around 220 Mly away, which includes AGC 102760, UGC 152, and UGC 166.

The NGC 70 Group is part of the Perseus-Pisces Supercluster.

== Members ==
galaxy	RA	DEC	redshift	size (ly)	distance (mly)
NGC 67	00^{h} 18^{m} 12.18^{s}	30° 03′ 17.5″	0.020734	40,000	275
NGC 67a	00^{h} 18^{m} 14.83^{s}	30° 03′ 45″	0.022162	35,000	300
NGC 68	00^{h} 18^{m} 18.48^{s}	30° 04′ 15.4″	0.01913	90,000	260
NGC 69	00^{h} 18^{m} 20.5^{s}	30° 02′ 21.2″	0.022285	80,000	300
NGC 70	00^{h} 18^{m} 22.6^{s}	30° 04′ 44″	0.023907	180,000	320
NGC 71	00^{h} 18^{m} 23.6^{s}	30° 03′ 45″	0.022339	130,000	300
NGC 72	00^{h} 18^{m} 28.36^{s}	30° 02′ 23.7″	0.024213	120,000	325
NGC 72a	00^{h} 18^{m} 34.35^{s}	30° 02′ 08″	0.022399	25,000	300
NGC 74	00^{h} 18^{m} 49.39^{s}	30° 03′ 39.1″	0.023646	65,000	315
GALEXASC J001817.48+295854.3	00^{h} 18^{m} 17^{s}	29° 58′ 50″	0.024981	30,000	335
PGC 1183	00^{h} 18^{m} 14.05^{s}	29° 57′ 05″	0.020374	70,000	275
PGC 1163	00^{h} 17^{m} 46.02^{s}	30° 09′ 4.5″	0.021885	75,000	295
2MASX J00174636+2957409	00^{h} 17^{m} 46.3^{s}	29° 57′ 39″	0.024113	60,000	325
2MASX J00183652+2955586	00^{h} 18^{m} 36.5^{s}	29° 55′ 55.2″	0.021475	30,000	290
2MASX J00181971+2954372	00^{h} 18^{m} 19.67^{s}	29° 54′ 35″	0.022192	50,000	300
2MASX J00181589+2954145	00^{h} 18^{m} 15.92^{s}	29° 54′ 12.5″	0.024093	45,000	325
2MASX J00191196+3000506	00^{h} 18^{m} 11.97^{s}	30° 00′ 47.8″	0.023456	45,000	315
2MASX J00191966+3005286	00^{h} 19^{m} 19.64^{s}	30° 05′ 26″	0.02389	60,000	320
2MASX J00183355+2950272	00^{h} 18^{m} 31.52^{s}	29° 50′ 24.3″	0.020981	30,000	285
2MASX J00174173+2951151	00^{h} 17^{m} 41.71^{s}	29° 51′ 12.4″	0.022359	35,000	300
PGC 1138	00^{h} 17^{m} 17.38^{s}	30° 12′ 30.5″	0.020988	55,000	285
PGC 1119	00^{h} 17^{m} 02.63^{s}	29° 56′ 29.7″	0.023116	80,000	310
NGC 76	00^{h} 19^{m} 37.81^{s}	29° 55′ 59.3″	0.02444	120,000	330
AGC 102761	00^{h} 19^{m} 43.83^{s}	30° 03′ 25.5″	0.023590	10,000	320
2MASX J00164915+3010462	00^{h} 16^{m} 49.16^{s}	30° 10′ 43.5″	0.024133	40,000	325
PGC 1266	00^{h} 19^{m} 43.06^{s}	29° 56′ 4.1″	0.022339	45,000	300
2MASX J00181849+2942002	00^{h} 18^{m} 18.47^{s}	29° 41′ 57.7″	0.022749	45,000	305
2MASX J00194032+2949286	00^{h} 19^{m} 40.35^{s}	29° 49′ 26.1″	0.025621	50,000	345
PGC 1090	00^{h} 16^{m} 32.85^{s}	30° 20′ 42.5″	0.021331	85,000	290
PGC 1220	00^{h} 18^{m} 55.28^{s}	30° 30′ 46.6″	0.02408	50,000	325
2MASX J00160018+3002561	00^{h} 16^{m} 00.31^{s}	30° 02′ 54.9″	0.022676	45,000	305
AGC 100116	00^{h} 15^{m} 55.55^{s}	30° 04′ 25.2″	0.022379	35,000	305
PGC 1084	00^{h} 16^{m} 24.93^{s}	30° 22′ 25.5″	0.021148	55,000	290
2MASX J00203207+3003013	00^{h} 20^{m} 32.06^{s}	30° 02′ 58.8″	0.021058	35,000	285
