= NGC 3016 =

Galaxy in Leo constellation

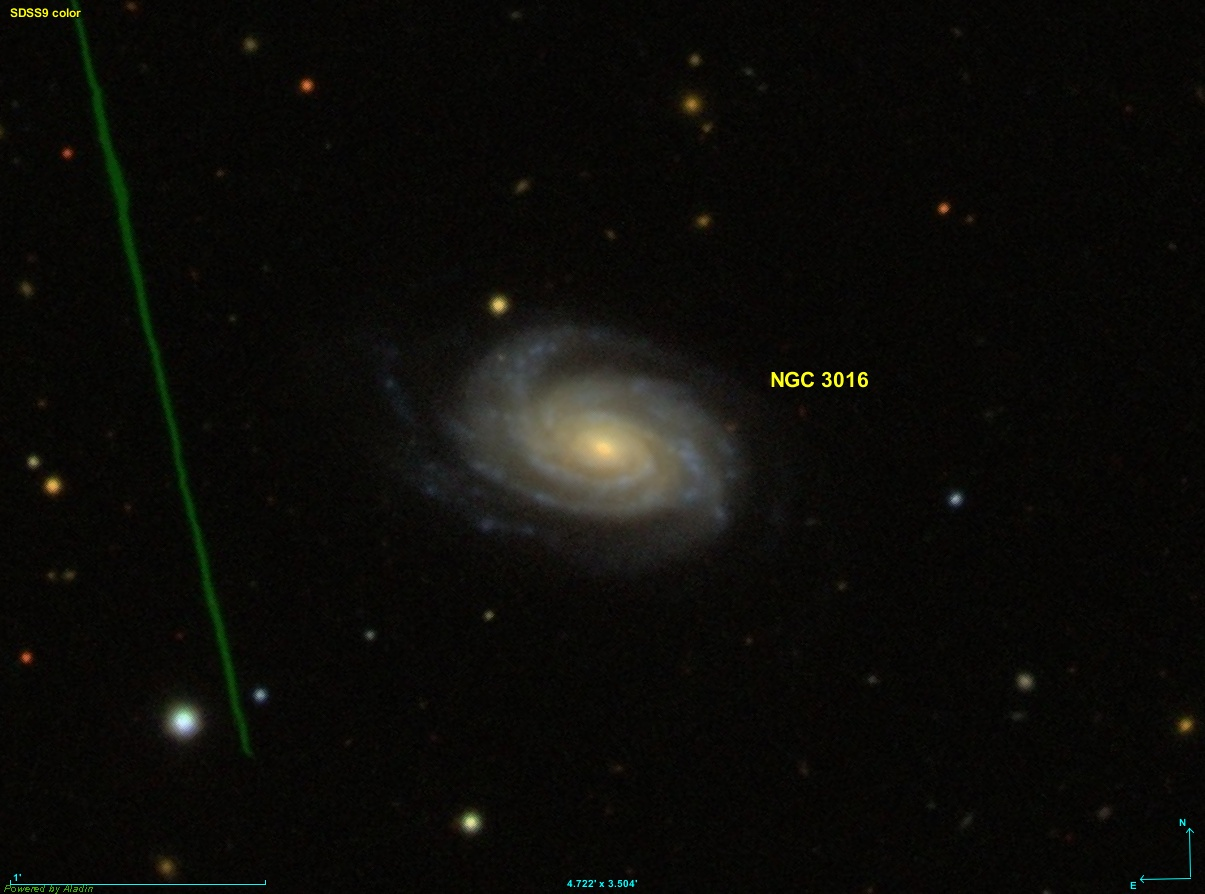
- Image of NGC 3016

Observation data (J2000 epoch)
- Constellation: Leo
- Right ascension: 09^{h} 49^{m} 59.6711^{s}
- Declination: 12° 41′ 42.766″
- Redshift: 0.029846 ± 0.00003
- Heliocentric radial velocity: 8948 ± 3 km/s
- Distance: 446.1 ± 31.2 Mly (136.79 ± 9.58 Mpc)
- Apparent magnitude (V): 12.31

Characteristics
- Type: Sb
- Size: ~194,000 ly (59.4 kpc) (estimated)

Other designations
- 2MASS J09495067+1241429, UGC 5266, LEDA 28269, PGC 28269

NGC 3016 (also known as PGC 28269) is a spiral galaxy in the constellation Leo. It was discovered on March 21, 1854 by R. J. Mitchell and also observed on December 31, 1864 by Heinrich Louis d'Arrest.

== See also ==
- List of NGC objects (3001-4000)
- List of NGC objects
