= NGC 1410 =

Lenticular galaxy in the constellation Taurus

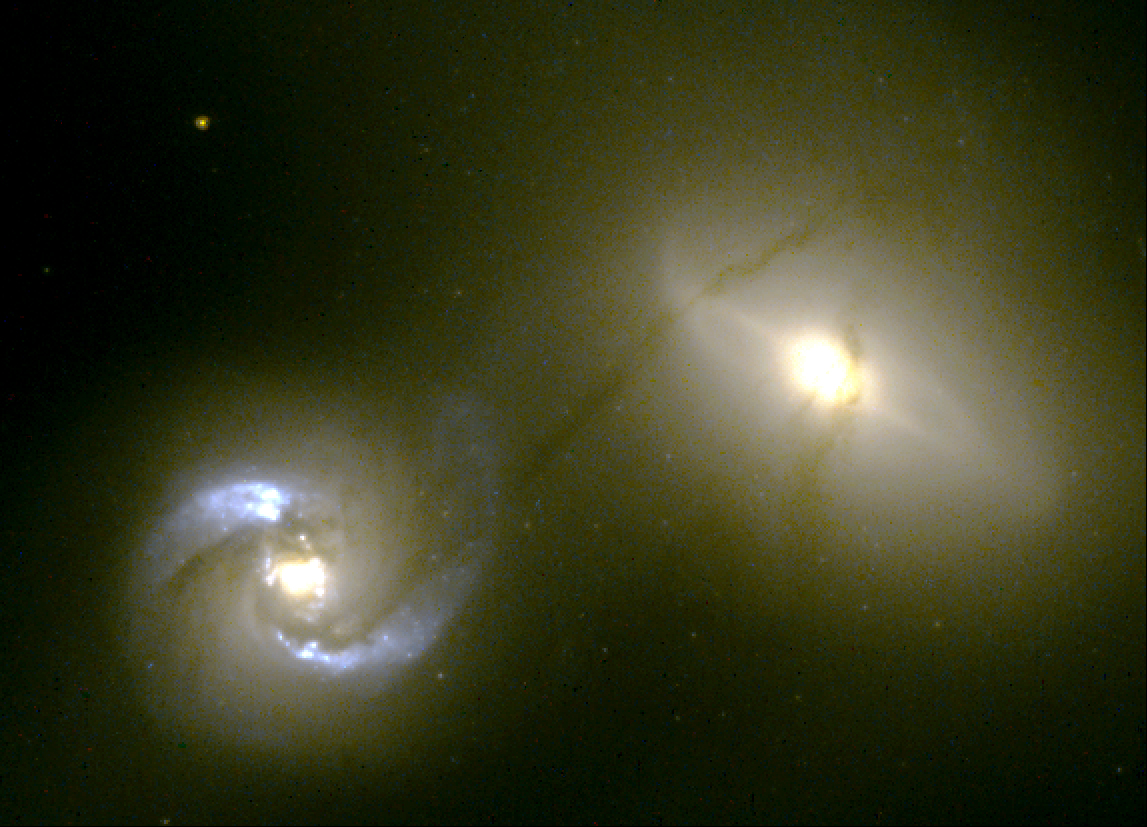
- Hubble Space Telescope image of NGC 1410 (left) and NGC 1409 (right); Credit: HST/NASA/ESA

Observation data (J2000 epoch)
- Constellation: Taurus
- Right ascension: 03^{h} 41^{m} 10.7^{s}
- Declination: −01° 17′ 55″
- Heliocentric radial velocity: 7,592±4 km/s
- Apparent magnitude (V): 15.4

Characteristics
- Type: S0 or E pec
- Apparent size (V): 1′.2 × 1′.2

Other designations
- III Zw 55, NGC 1410, UGC 2821, PGC 13556

NGC 1410 is a peculiar lenticular galaxy in the constellation Taurus. It was discovered on January 17, 1855, by English astronomer R. J. Mitchell. NGC 1410 is located in close proximity to the larger lenticular galaxy NGC 1409, and the two are strongly interacting. Their respective nuclei have a separation of just 23 kly, and they share a diffuse stellar envelope with a radius extending out to 49 kly.

This is classified as a type II Seyfert galaxy and it appears to be undergoing star formation, unlike its neighbor NGC 1409. It shows signs of being dynamically perturbed, particularly along the western side. There is a conspicuous pipeline of dust and gas being funneled from NGC 1410 to NGC 1409. This lane has a typical width of 330 ly with an estimated mass of 3×10^{8} M_{☉} and is transferring mass at the estimated rate of 1.1–1.4 M_{☉} yr^{–1}.
