= NGC 3019 =

Galaxy in Leo constellation

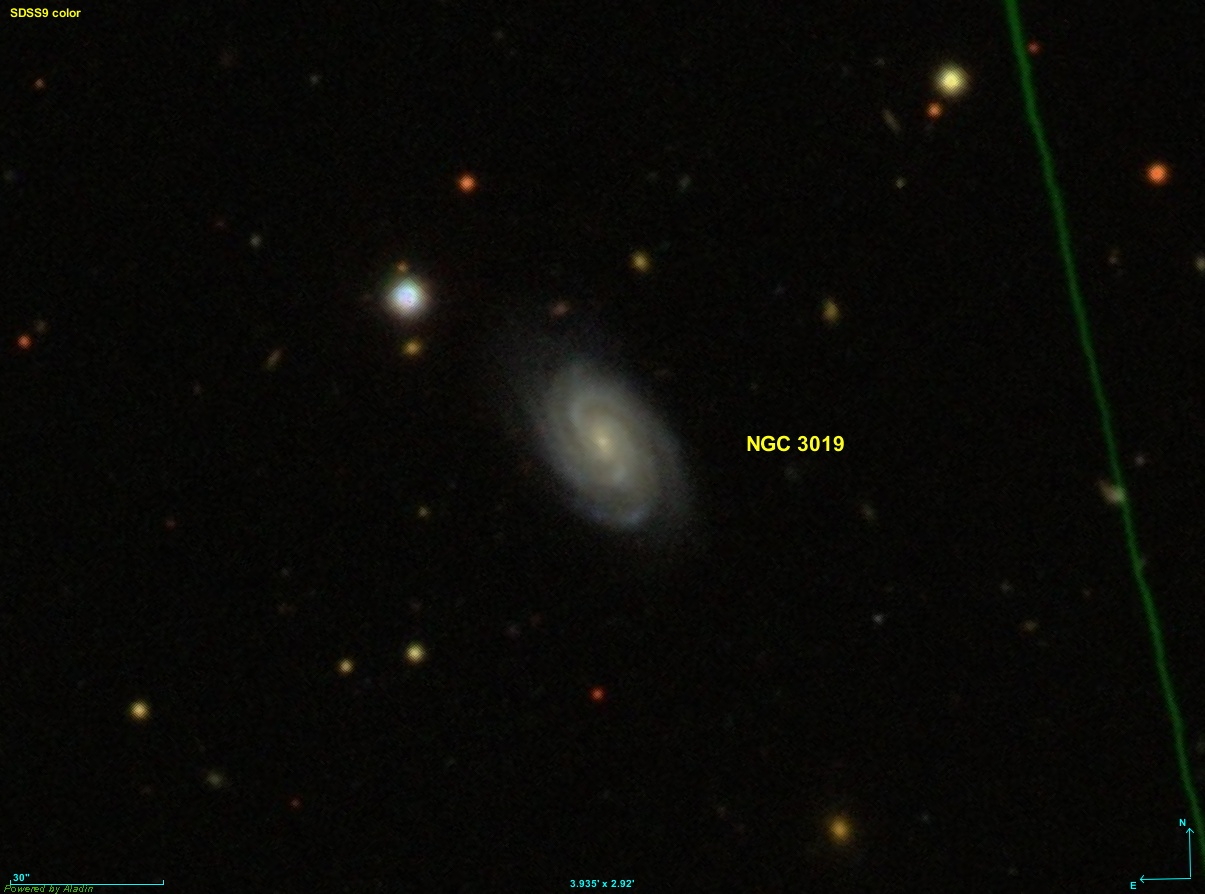
- Image of NGC 3019

Observation data (J2000 epoch)
- Constellation: Leo
- Right ascension: 09^{h} 50^{m} 07.1971^{s}
- Declination: +12° 44′ 45.948″
- Redshift: 0.029619 ± 0.00000109
- Heliocentric radial velocity: 8880 ± 3 km/s
- Galactocentric velocity: 8770 ± 5 km/s
- Distance: 442.9 ± 31.0 Mly (135.78 ± 9.51 Mpc)
- Apparent magnitude (V): 15

Characteristics
- Type: Sc
- Size: ~168,400 ly (51.62 kpc) (estimated)

Other designations
- WISEA J095007.19+124445.9, LEDA 28295, PGC 28295

NGC 3019 (also known as PGC 28295) is a spiral galaxy in the constellation Leo. It was discovered on Mar 21, 1854 by R. J. Mitchell.

== See also ==
- List of NGC objects (3001-4000)
- List of NGC objects
