= NGC 770 =

Galaxy in the constellation Aries

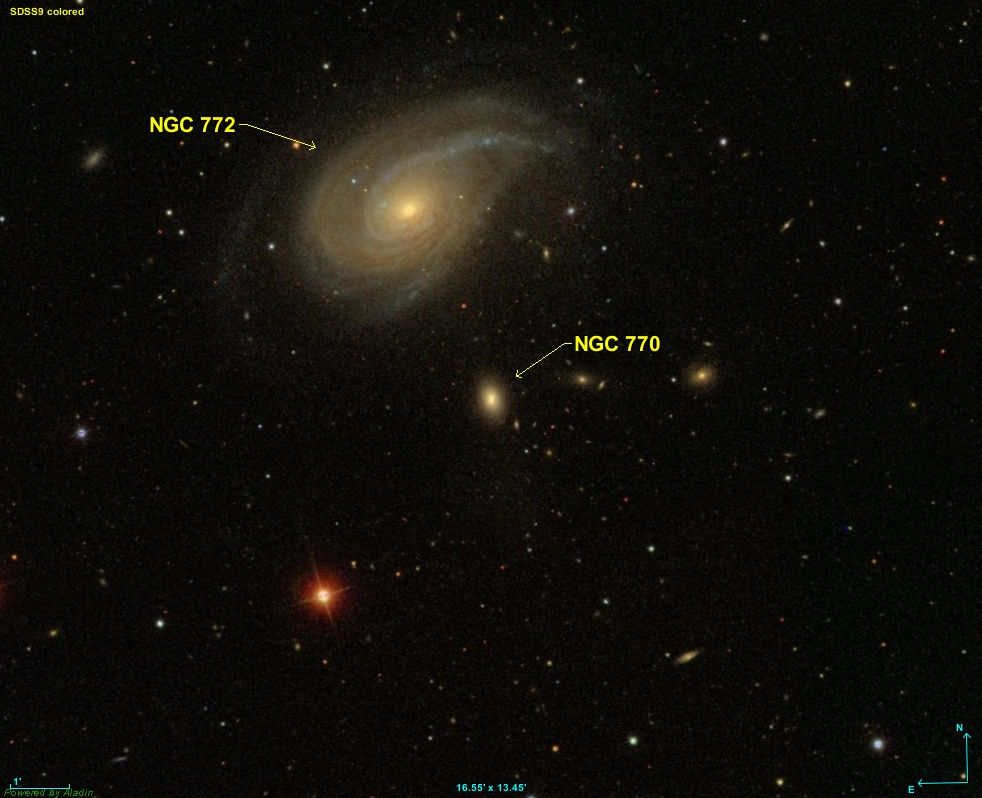
- NGC 770 and NGC 772 imaged by the Sloan Digital Sky Survey

Observation data (J2000 epoch)
- Constellation: Aries
- Right ascension: 01^{h} 59^{m} 13.64260^{s}
- Declination: +18° 57′ 16.7211″
- Heliocentric radial velocity: 2,543
- Distance: 120 Mly (36.7 Mpc)

Characteristics
- Type: E3:
- Apparent size (V): 0.587″ × 0.399″

Other designations
- UGC 1463, PGC 7517

NGC 770 is an elliptical galaxy in the constellation Aries. It is around 120 million light years from the Milky Way and has a diameter of around 36,000 ly. NGC 770 is gravitationally linked to NGC 772. The galaxy was discovered on November 3, 1855 by R. J. Mitchell.

NGC 770 is part of a galaxy group known as NGC 772 Group or LGG 40. NGC 772 Group has 4 members, NGC 772, NGC 770, UGC 1546 and UGC 1519.
