= NGC 5896 =

Spiral galaxy in constellation Boötes

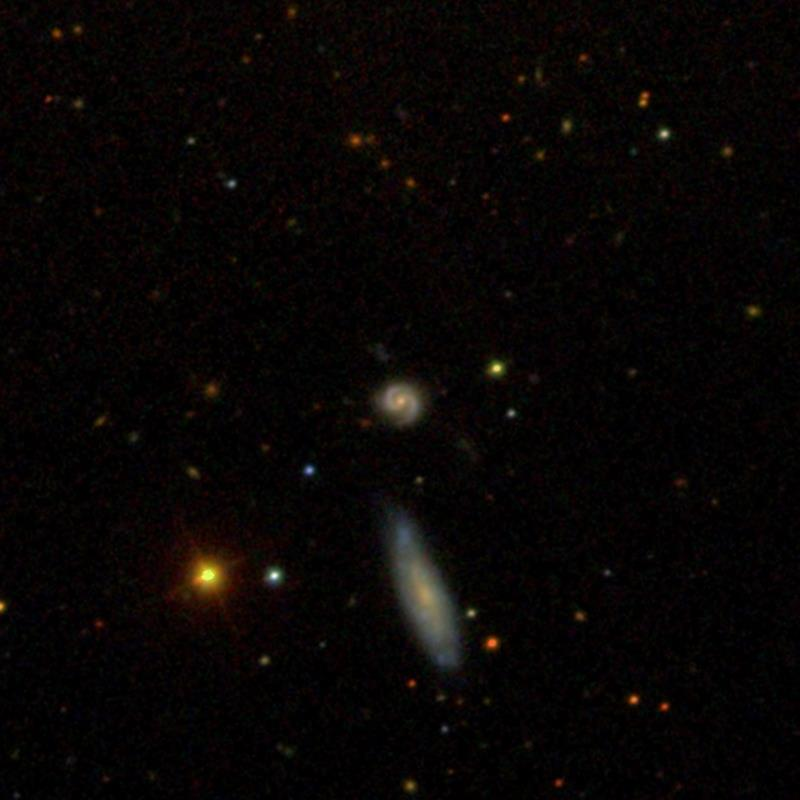

Observation data (J2000 epoch)
- Constellation: Boötes
- Right ascension: 15^{h} 13^{m} 50.672^{s}
- Declination: +42° 01′ 27.25″
- Redshift: 0.06561 ± 0.00006
- Heliocentric radial velocity: 19,025 km/s
- Distance: 953 Mly

Characteristics
- Type: Sc
- Size: 91,000 ly

Other designations
- PGC 54367, MCG+07-031-044, LEDA 54367, SDSS J151350.67+420127.2

NGC 5896 is a small spiral galaxy located 953 million light-years away in the constellation of Boötes. The object was found on 23 May 1854 by R. J. Mitchell, an Irish astronomer and assistant to William Parsons. At a redshift of 0.065, NGC 5896 is one of the most distant objects in the NGC Catalogue.

According to sources, the neighboring galaxy NGC 5895 and NGC 5896 form an optical pair. But the latter is much further, and it is considered as a background galaxy.
