= NGC 2688 =

Spiral galaxy located in the constellation Ursa Major

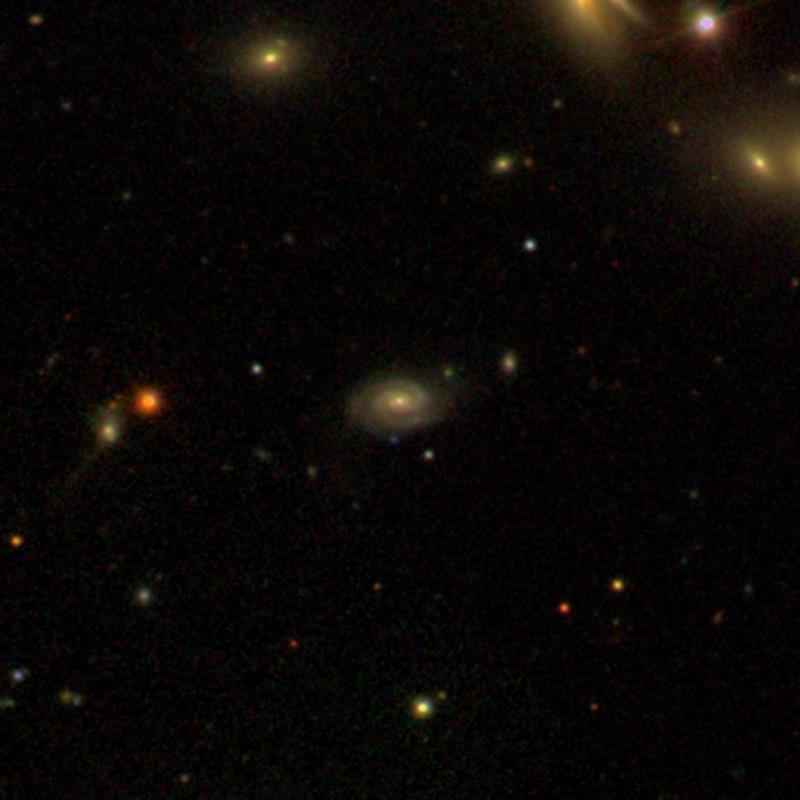

Observation data (J2000 epoch)
- Constellation: Ursa Major
- Right ascension: 08^{h} 55^{m} 11.606^{s}
- Declination: +49° 07′ 21.46″
- Redshift: 0.05204 0.00001
- Heliocentric radial velocity: 15,190 km/s
- Distance: 758 Mly (232.4 Mpc)
- Apparent magnitude (V): 15.8

Characteristics
- Type: Sb
- Size: 154,000 ly

Other designations
- PGC 25048, 2MASX J08551161+4907218, MCG+08-16-040, SDSS J085511.60+490721.3

NGC 2688 is a spiral galaxy located in Ursa Major. It is located 758 million light-years away from the Solar System and is moving away at a speed of 15,190 km/s. NGC 2688 was found by R.J. Mitchell who was an Irish astronomer and assistant to William Parsons. When Mitchell first saw the object, he commented it as very small and faint. According to Professor Seligman, the galaxy is classified as a lenticular galaxy rather than a spiral galaxy.
