= NGC 1409 =

Lenticular galaxy in the constellation Taurus

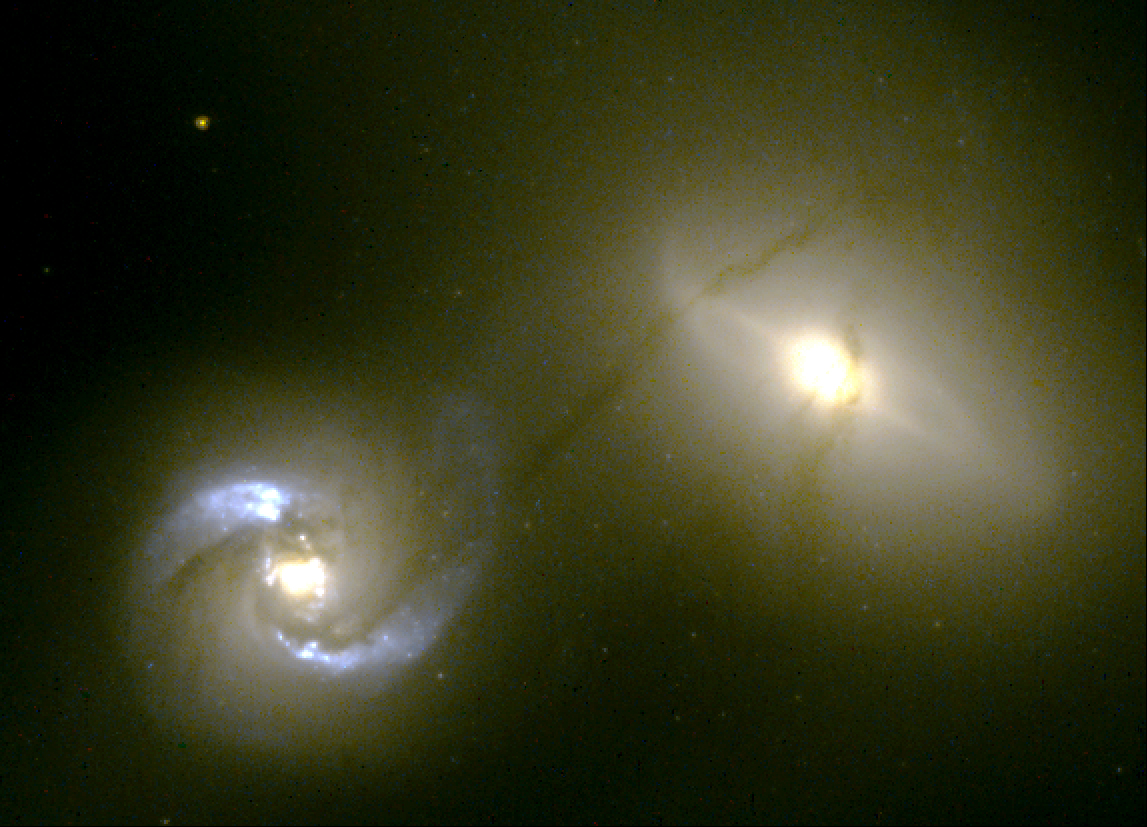
- Hubble Space Telescope image of NGC 1410 (left) and NGC 1409 (right); Credit: HST/NASA/ESA

Observation data (J2000 epoch)
- Constellation: Taurus
- Right ascension: 03^{h} 41^{m} 10.546^{s}
- Declination: −01° 18′ 10.12″
- Heliocentric radial velocity: 7750±40 km/s
- Apparent magnitude (V): 15.4

Characteristics
- Type: SB0 or SAB pec
- Apparent size (V): 1′.0 × 0′.8
- Notable features: Interacting with NGC 1410

Other designations
- NGC 1409, UGC 2821, PGC 13553

NGC 1409 is a quiescent lenticular galaxy in the equatorial constellation of Taurus. It was discovered by the German-born astronomer William Herschel on January 6, 1785. NGC 1409 is located in close proximity to the smaller Seyfert galaxy NGC 1410, and the two are strongly interacting. Their respective nuclei have a separation of just 23 kly, and they share a diffuse stellar envelope with a radius extending out to 49 kly.

The morphological classification of this galaxy most closely matches type SB0, which indicates a barred lenticular galaxy. There is a conspicuous pipeline of dust and gas being funneled to NGC 1409 from NGC 1410. This lane has a typical width of 330 ly, passing to the north in front of NGC 1409 and then behind, becoming denser toward the galactic core. It has an estimated mass of 3×10^{8} M_{☉} and is transferring mass at the estimated rate of 1.1–1.4 M_{☉} yr^{−1}. However, there is no indications of recent star formation in NGC 1409 from this incoming material.
