= NGC 90 =

Galaxy in the constellation Andromeda

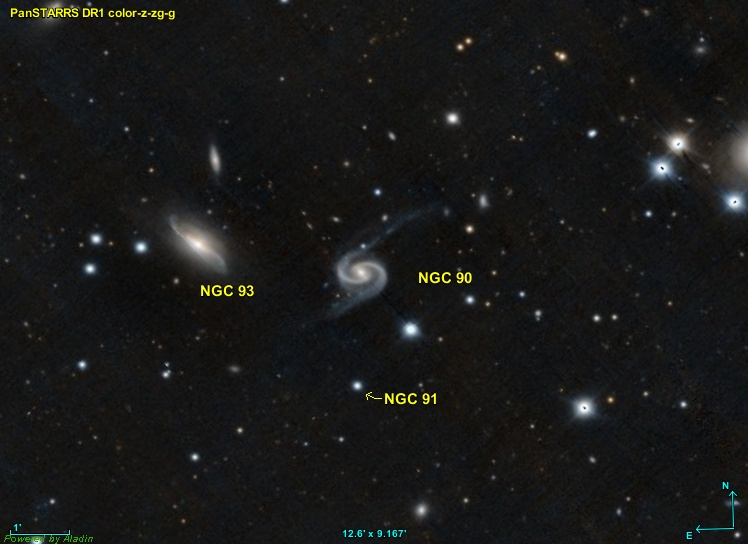
- NGC 90 (center) with its spiral companion NGC 93 to the right. NGC 91 can also be seen below.

Observation data (J2000 epoch)
- Constellation: Andromeda
- Right ascension: 00^{h} 21^{m} 51.4^{s}
- Declination: +22° 24′ 00″
- Redshift: 0.017856
- Heliocentric radial velocity: 5353 ± 10 km/s
- Distance: 333.8 ± 146 Mly (102.35 ± 44.76 Mpc)
- Apparent magnitude (V): 13.7

Characteristics
- Type: SAB(s)c pec
- Mass: ~4.9 × 10^10 M⊙ M_{☉}
- Apparent size (V): 2.4' x 0.91'
- Notable features: Interaction with NGC 93, tidal tails and large H I cloud

Other designations
- UGC 208, MCG+04-02-011, PGC 1405, Arp 65

NGC 90 is a grand-design spiral galaxy estimated to be about 333 million light years (102 megaparsecs) away in the constellation of Andromeda. The galaxy is currently interacting with NGC 93 and exhibits two highly elongated and distorted spiral arms. These arms have bright blue star clusters which is indicative of star formation, likely caused by the interaction with its neighbor. NGC 90 and NGC 93 form the interacting galaxy pair Arp 65 in the Atlas of Peculiar Galaxies. Its interaction with NGC 93 has caused it produced characteristic similar to jellyfish galaxies such as tidal tails and escaping clouds of gas.

It was discovered by R. J. Mitchell in 1854 and its apparent magnitude is 13.7.

== Morphology ==
NGC 90 is a grand-design spiral galaxy with two tidal arms extending from the main grand design arms. They are thin and long with one being aimed towards the northwest of the galaxy and a smoother, shorter one pointing in the opposite direction. These tidal tails straighten out towards the periphery.

== Characteristics ==
NGC 90 is interacting with another spiral galaxy located 64 kiloparsecs away, known as NGC 93, together forming Arp 65. A interaction with NGC 93 occurred roughly 100-250 million years ago displacing a large amount of gas far beyond its main disk. This interaction has caused two tidal tails extending from the galaxy. Along the western tidal tail and east of the disk, there are several regions of star formation outside the main disk of the galaxy. Evidence for this can be seen with images of bright blue regions which is indicative of star formation regions and populations of young stars.

The central regions of the galaxy is affected by photoionization creating shocks.

=== Cloud ===
Perhaps the most interesting thing about NGC 90 is its large H I cloud located southeast of the galaxy. This cloud has a mass of 6.8 × 10^{9} solar masses meaning that this cloud contains about half of the galaxies total gas content in terms of mass. It is being displaced outwards from the galaxy traveling at a velocity of around 340 km/s. At velocities this high, it is not gravitationally bounded to NGC 90. The cause of this cloud and its speed is likely due to forces of ram pressure stripping being applied to NGC 90 as it travels through the hot gas of the galaxy group. This means that NGC 90 could be a potential jellyfish galaxy. Another factor influencing the loss of gas in NGC 90 is the interaction with the more gas-rich companion.

H I clouds were only marginally detected in the main galaxy. The clouds that were detected has an asymmetric morphology.
