= NGC 94 =

Lenticular galaxy in the constellation Andromeda

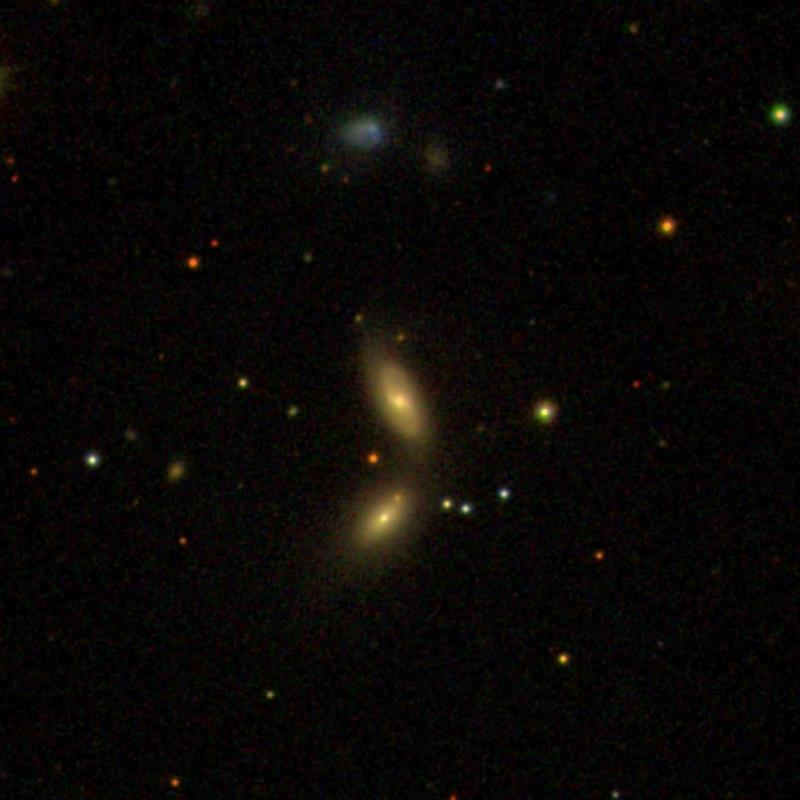
- SDSS image of NGC 94

Observation data (J2000 epoch)
- Constellation: Andromeda
- Right ascension: 00^{h} 22^{m} 13.516^{s}
- Declination: +22° 28′ 59.22″
- Redshift: 0.019604
- Heliocentric radial velocity: 5877
- Distance: 260 Mly (80 Mpc)
- Apparent magnitude (B): 15.6

Characteristics
- Type: S0
- Size: 50,000 ly (15,000 pc)
- Apparent size (V): 0.45′ × 0.4′

Other designations
- PGC 1423

NGC 94 (PGC 1423) is a lenticular galaxy in the constellation Andromeda. It was discovered by Guillaume Bigourdan in 1884. This object is extremely faint and small. A little above the galaxy is NGC 96. NGC 94 is about 260 million light-years away and 50,000 light-years across.
