= NGC 91 =

Star in the constellation Andromeda

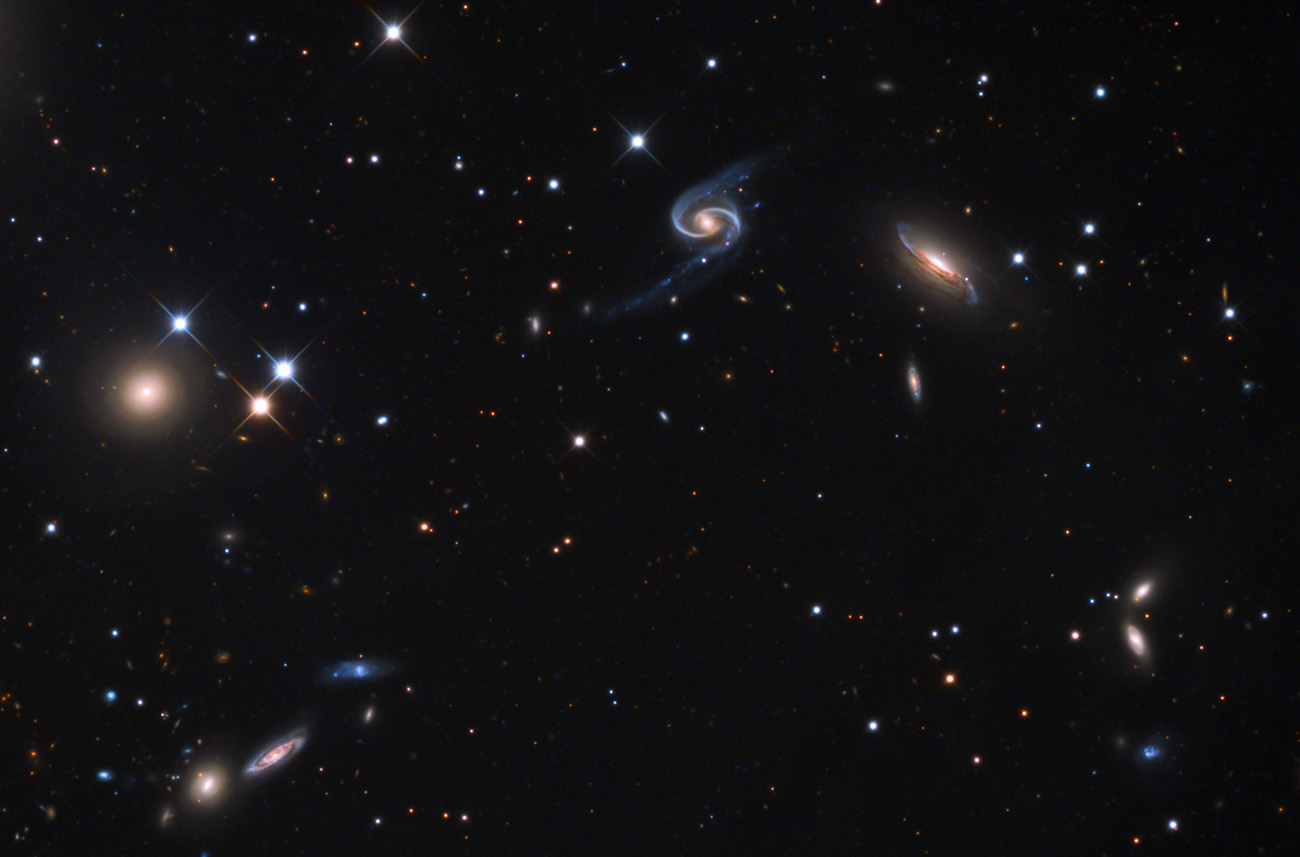
- Location of NGC 91 (circled, south is up)

Observation data Epoch J2000 Equinox ICRS
- Constellation: Andromeda
- Right ascension: 00^{h} 21^{m} 51.633^{s}
- Declination: +22° 22′ 05.52″
- Apparent magnitude (V): 14.4

Astrometry
Parallax (π)	0.4985±0.0399 mas
Distance	6,500 ± 500 ly (2,000 ± 200 pc)

Other designations
- 2MASS J00215163+2222055

Database references
SIMBAD	data

NGC 91 (PGC 3325956, GC 41, GC 5097, or NPD 68 22.9) is a star with an apparent magnitude of 14.4 in the constellation of Andromeda. The star is southwest of the galaxy NGC 90. Discovered in 1866 by Herman Schultz, there have been many arguments if this star exists or not. However, people have observed the star, and have confirmed that NGC 91 exists.
