= NGC 772 =

Galaxy in the constellation Aries

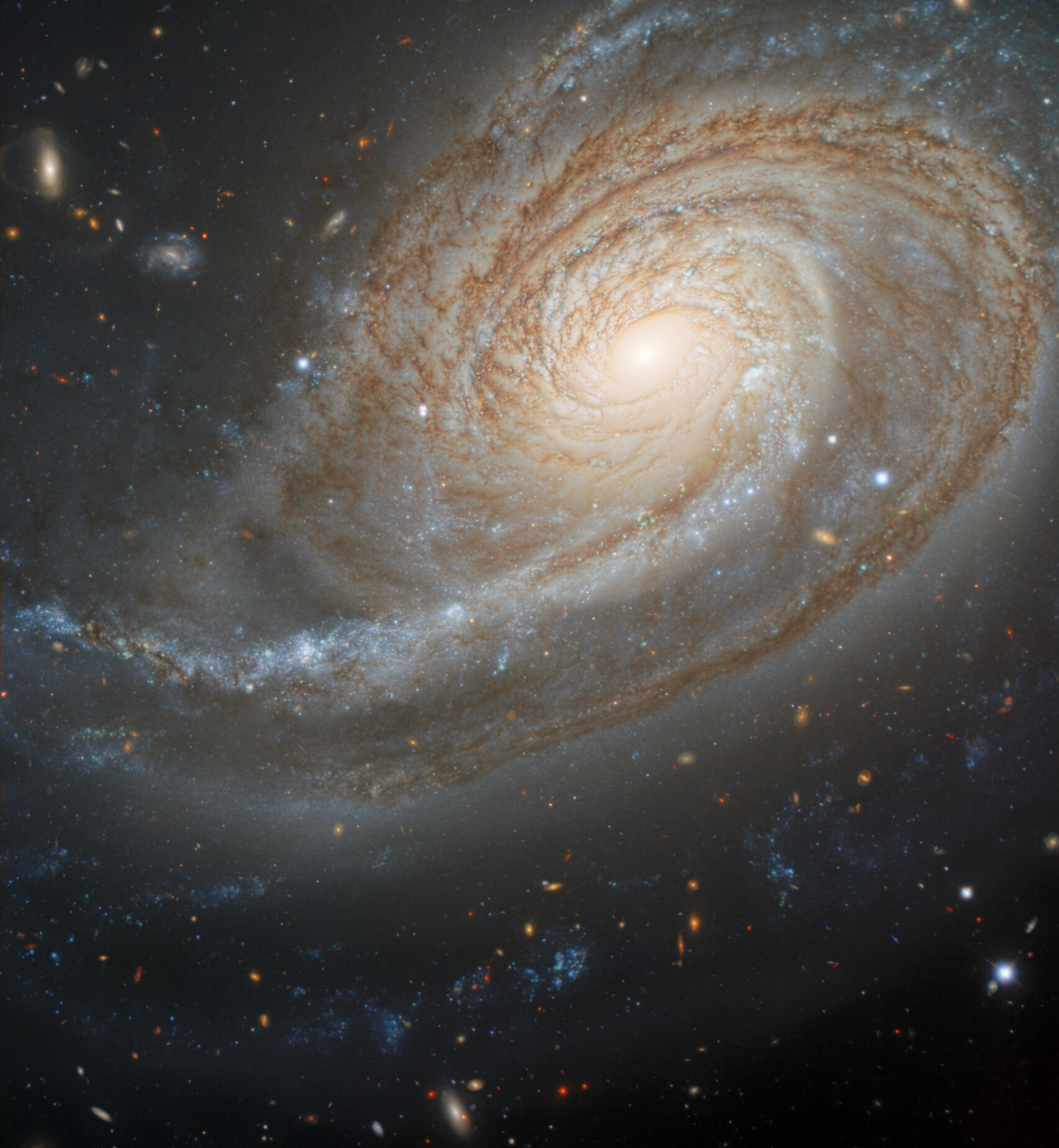
- NGC 772 imaged by the Gemini Observatory

Observation data (J2000 epoch)
- Constellation: Aries
- Right ascension: 01^{h} 59^{m} 19.5443^{s}
- Declination: +19° 00′ 27.751″
- Redshift: 0.008236
- Heliocentric radial velocity: 2,469±2 km/s
- Distance: 105.7 ± 7.5 Mly (32.42 ± 2.29 Mpc)
- Apparent magnitude (V): 10.3

Characteristics
- Type: SA(s)b
- Size: ~204,000 ly (62.56 kpc) (estimated)
- Apparent size (V): 7.2′ × 4.3′

Other designations
- IRAS 01565+1845, Arp 78, UGC 1466, MCG +03-06-011, PGC 7525, CGCG 461-018

NGC 772 is a large unbarred spiral galaxy approximately 106 million light-years away in the constellation Aries. Alternatively, it is known as Arp 78 or the Fiddlehead Galaxy. It was discovered by German-British astronomer William Herschel on 29 November 1785.

== Characteristics ==
At around 200,000 light years in diameter, NGC 772 is somewhat larger than the Milky Way Galaxy, and is surrounded by several satellite galaxies – including the dwarf elliptical, NGC 770 – whose tidal forces on the larger galaxy have likely caused the emergence of a single elongated outer spiral arm that is much more developed and stronger than the other arms. Halton Arp includes NGC 772 in his Atlas of Peculiar Galaxies as Arp 78, where it is described as a "Spiral galaxy with a small high-surface brightness companion".

NGC 772 probably has a H II nucleus, but it may be a transitional object. NGC 772 is part of a galaxy group known as NGC 772 Group or LGG 40. NGC 772 Group has 4 members, NGC 772, NGC 770, UGC 1546 and UGC 1519.

== Supernovae ==
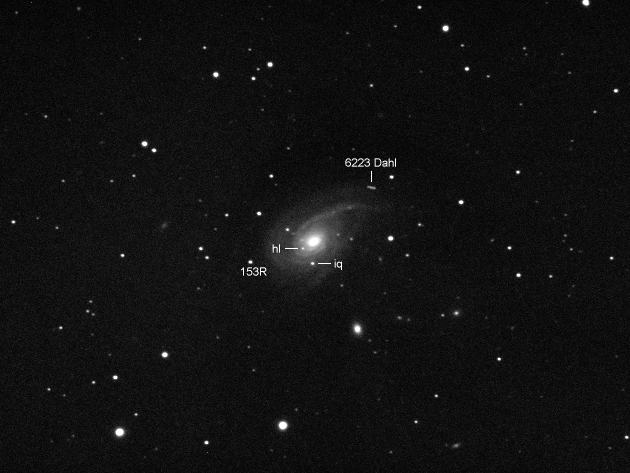
Two supernovae in the galaxy (SN 2003hl & 2003iq) and asteroid 6223 Dahl passing through the shot

Three supernovae have been observed in NGC 772:

- SN 2003hl (Type II, mag. 16.5) was discovered by LOTOSS (Lick Observatory and Tenagra Observatory Supernova Searches) on 20 August 2003.
- SN 2003iq (Type II, mag. 16.4) was discovered by Jean-Marie Llapasset on 8 October 2003. This supernova was visible at the same time as SN 2003hl, which had been discovered 7 weeks prior.
- SN 2022qze (Type II-P, mag. 19.89) was discovered by Pan-STARRS on 8 August 2022.

== Gallery ==
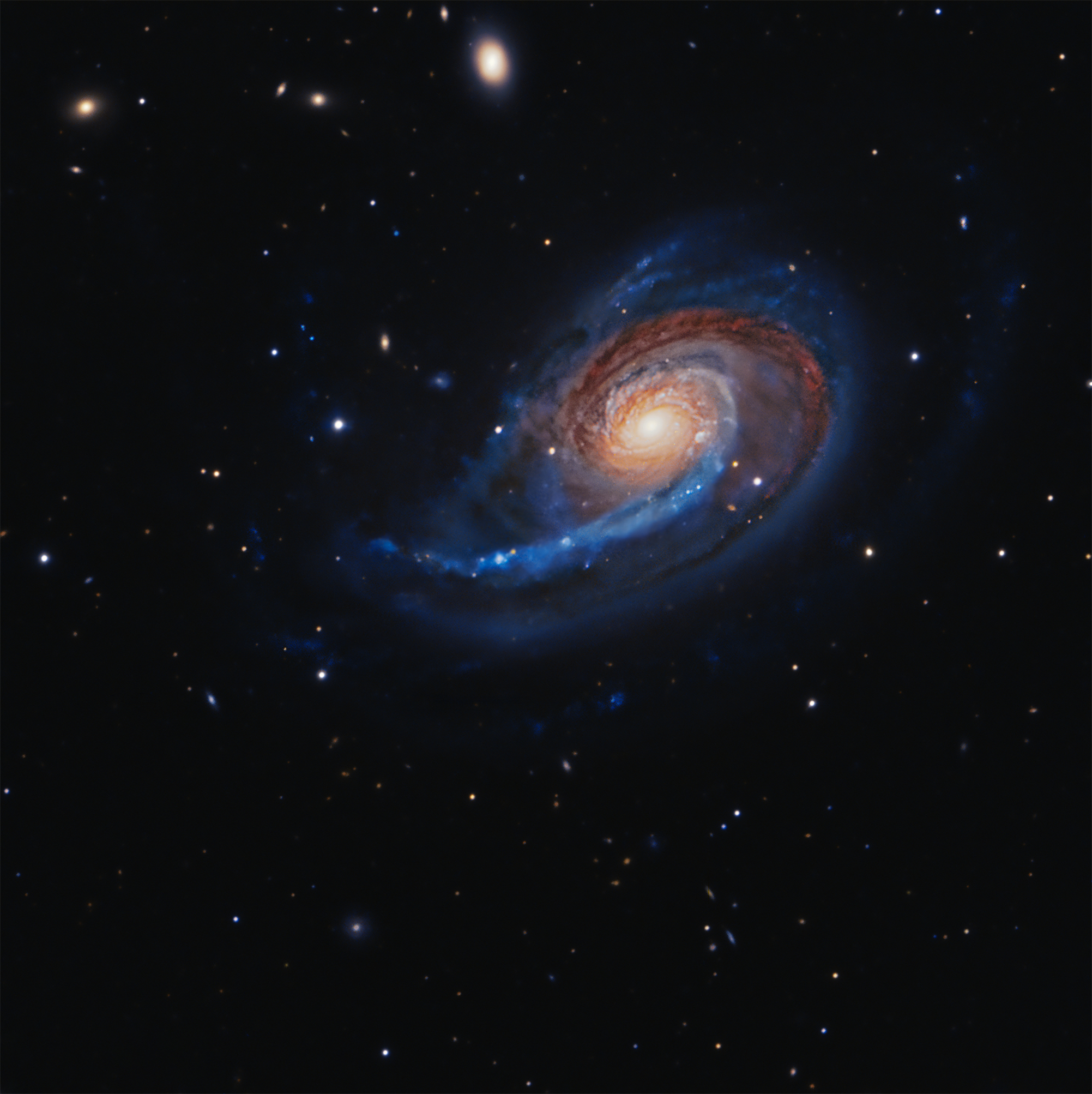
RGB image of the galaxy NGC 772 and dwarf galaxy NGC 770 (top center) interacting, from the Liverpool Telescope

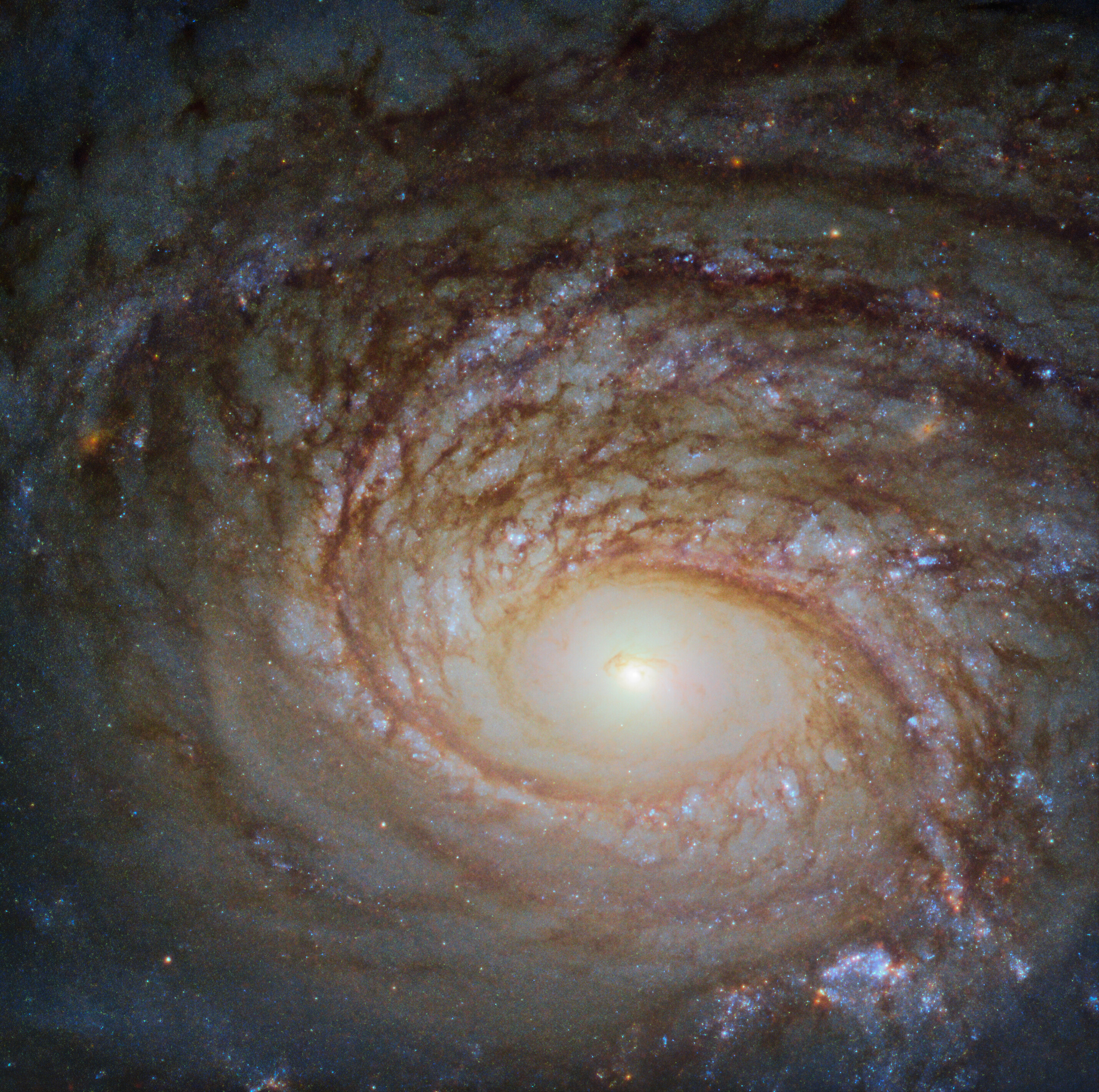
Center of the galaxy imaged by the Hubble Space Telescope.

== See also ==
- NGC 1097
- Whirlpool Galaxy
