= NGC 72 =

Galaxy in the constellation Andromeda

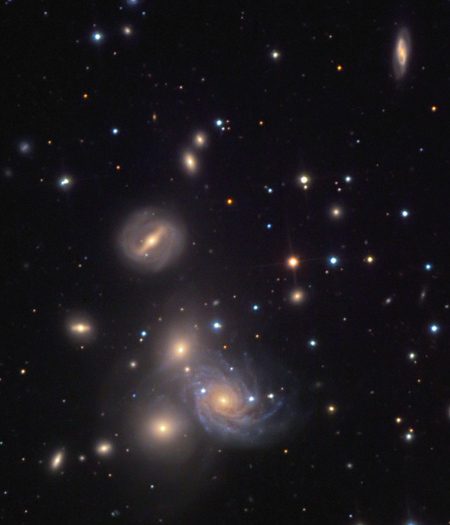
- NGC 72, located directly above NGC 71 and below NGC 71 is spiral galaxy NGC 70 (right) and NGC 68 (left)

Observation data (J2000.0 epoch)
- Constellation: Andromeda
- Right ascension: 00^{h} 18^{m} 28.4^{s}
- Declination: +30^{h} 02^{m} 26.5^{s}
- Redshift: 0.024213
- Heliocentric radial velocity: 7259 km/s
- Distance: 320-325 Mly
- Apparent magnitude (V): 13.5

Characteristics
- Type: Sb Sbc SA(rs)c
- Size: 180,000
- Apparent size (V): ~1.3'x1.0'

Other designations
- UGC 176, ARP 113, VV 166d, MCG +05-01-069, 2MASX J00182837+3002265, 2MASXi J00182837+3002265, PGC 001204

NGC 72 is a barred spiral galaxy estimated to be about 320 million light-years away in the constellation of Andromeda. It was discovered by R. J. Mitchell in 1855 and its magnitude is 13.5.

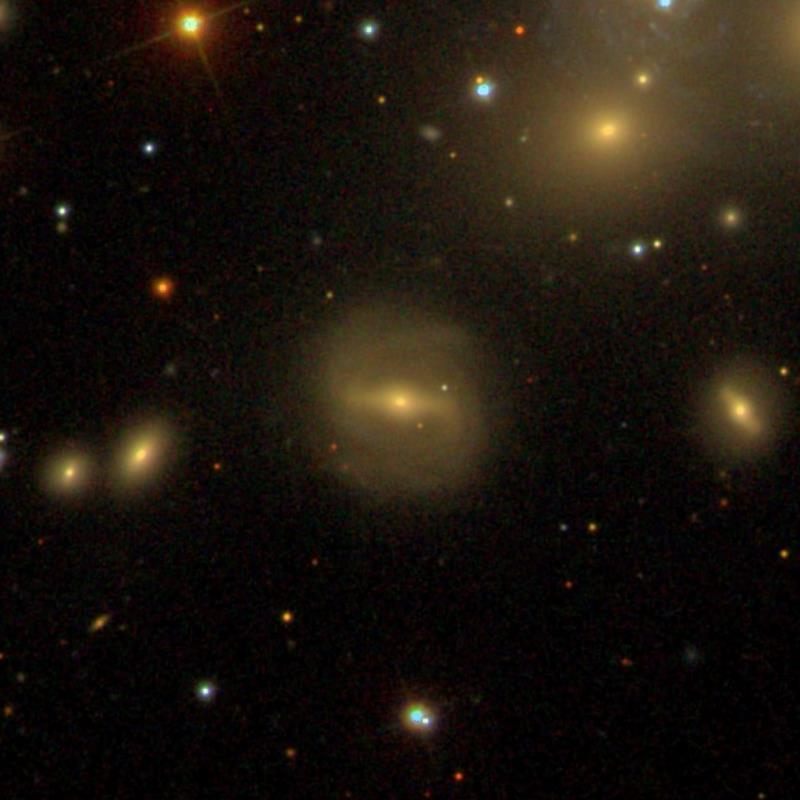
