= NGC 69 =

Galaxy in the constellation Andromeda

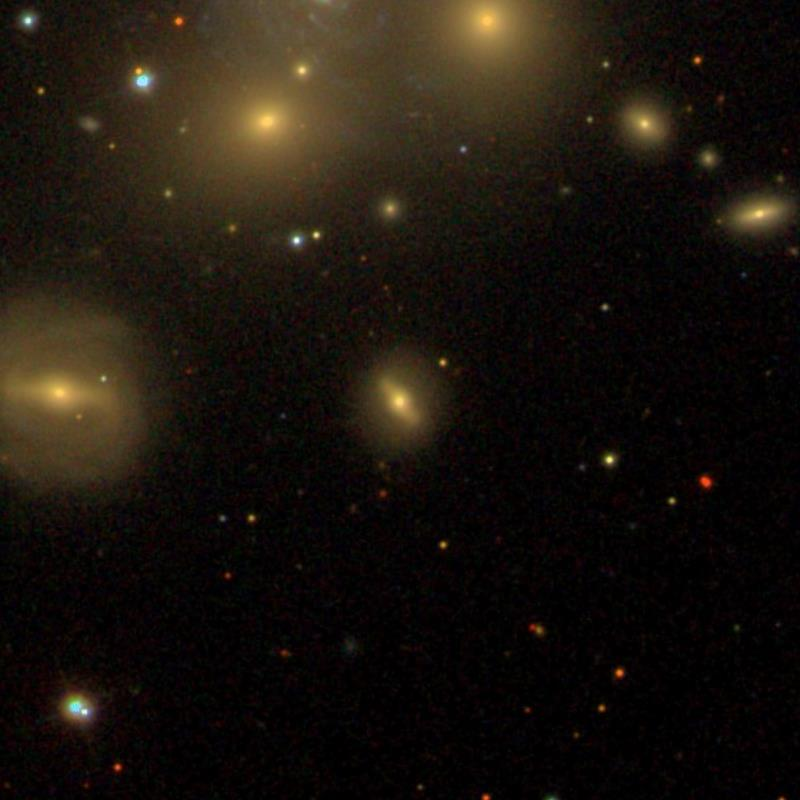
- SDSS image of NGC 69

Observation data (J2000 epoch)
- Constellation: Andromeda
- Right ascension: 00^{h} 18^{m} 20.49510^{s}
- Declination: +30° 02′ 23.8402″
- Redshift: 0.02229
- Heliocentric radial velocity: 6607 km/s
- Distance: 305.6 ± 21.5 Mly (93.70 ± 6.58 Mpc)
- Group or cluster: NGC 68 group
- Apparent magnitude (V): 14.71
- Apparent magnitude (B): 15.76

Characteristics
- Type: SB0^{−}(s)

Other designations
- MCG +05-01-066, PGC 1191

NGC 69 is a barred lenticular galaxy located in the constellation Andromeda. It is a member of the NGC 68 group. It was discovered in 1855 by R. J. Mitchell, who described it as "extremely faint, very small, round."

== See also ==
- NGC
- List of NGC objects (1–1000)
- List of NGC objects
- Galaxy
