= NGC 86 =

Spiral galaxy in the constellation Andromeda

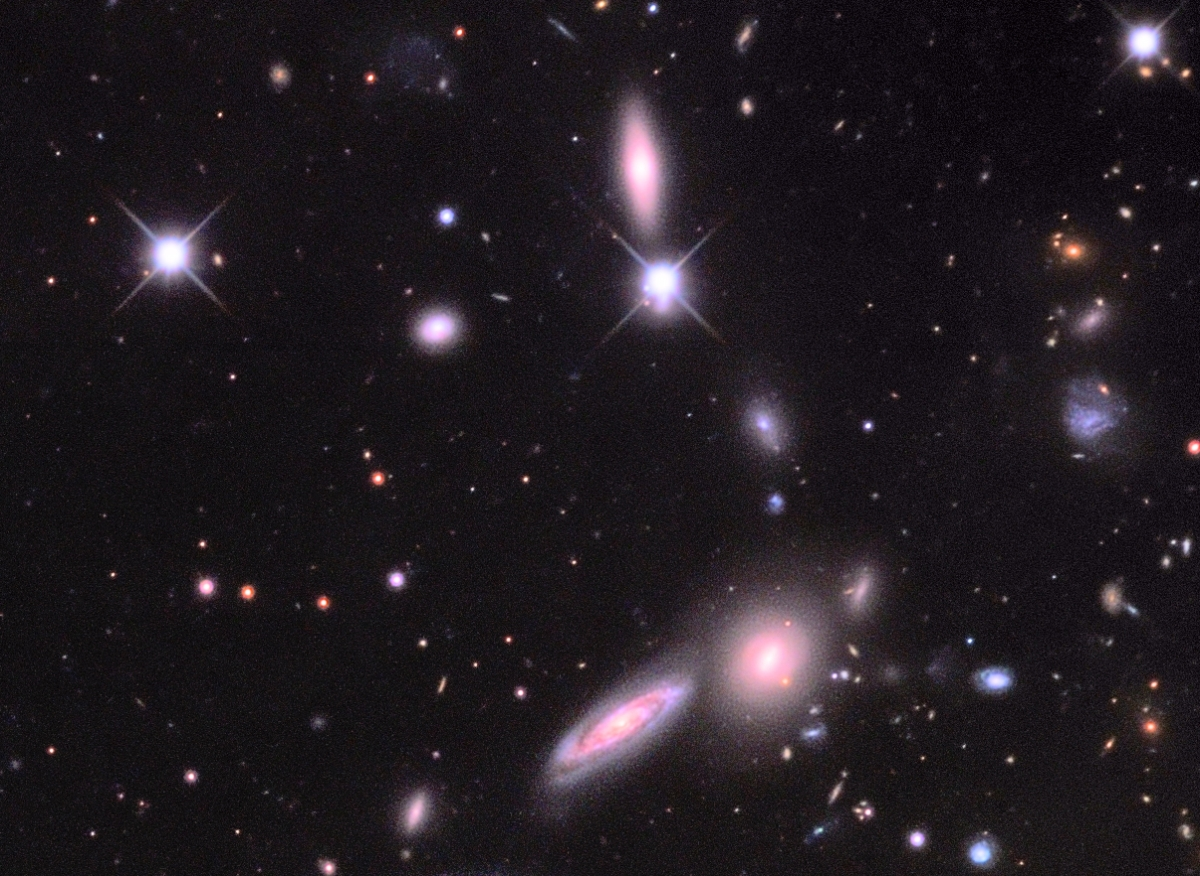
- NGC 86 is the bright galaxy near the top.

Observation data (J2000 epoch)
- Constellation: Andromeda
- Right ascension: 00^{h} 21^{m} 28.586^{s}
- Declination: +22° 33′ 22.96″
- Redshift: 0.018650
- Heliocentric radial velocity: 5591
- Distance: 289.71 ± 11.92 Mly (88.825 ± 3.655 Mpc)
- Apparent magnitude (B): 14.9

Characteristics
- Type: S0
- Size: 24,000 ly (7,360 pc)
- Apparent size (V): 0.55′ × 0.198′

Other designations
- MCG+04-02-009, PGC 1383

NGC 86 is a lenticular galaxy estimated to be between 275 and 300 million light-years away in the constellation of Andromeda. It was discovered by Guillaume Bigourdan in 1884 and its apparent magnitude is 14.9.
