= NGC 79 =

Elliptical galaxy in the constellation Andromeda

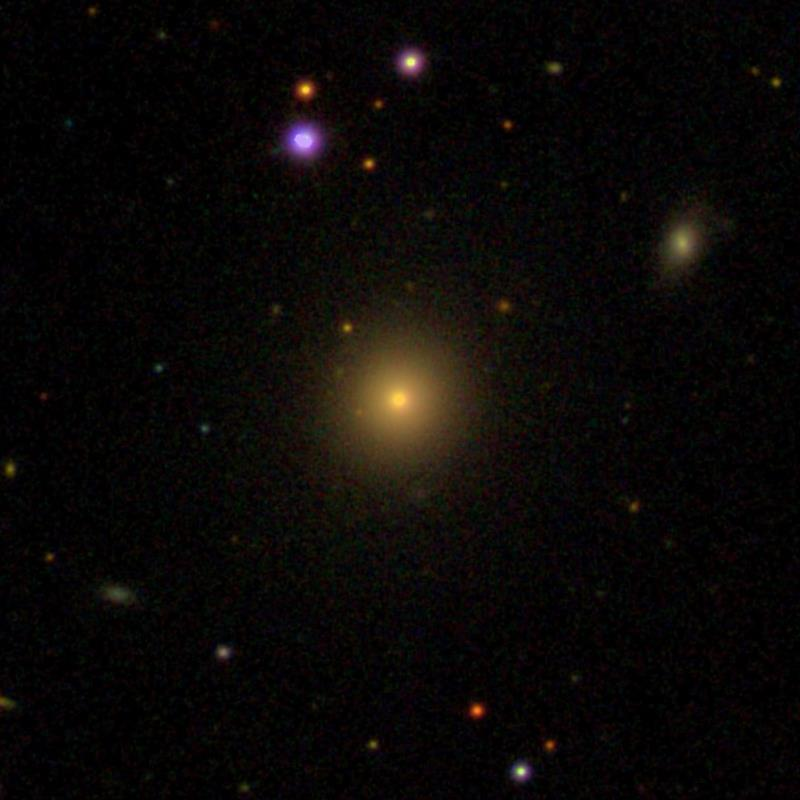
- SDSS image of NGC 79

Observation data (J2000 epoch)
- Constellation: Andromeda
- Right ascension: 00^{h} 21^{m} 02.838^{s}
- Declination: +22° 33′ 59.06″
- Redshift: 0.018326
- Heliocentric radial velocity: 5444 km/s
- Distance: 272.54 ± 0.75 Mly (83.56 ± 0.23 Mpc)
- Apparent magnitude (B): 15.16

Characteristics
- Type: cE

Other designations
- MCG +04-02-003, PGC 1340

NGC 79 is an elliptical galaxy estimated to be about 270 million light-years away in the constellation of Andromeda. NGC 79 is its New General Catalogue designation. Its apparent magnitude is 14.9. It was discovered on 14 November 1884 by Guillaume Bigourdan.

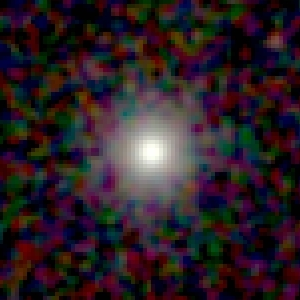
NGC 79 (near-infrared)
