= NGC 93 =

Spiral galaxy in the constellation Andromeda

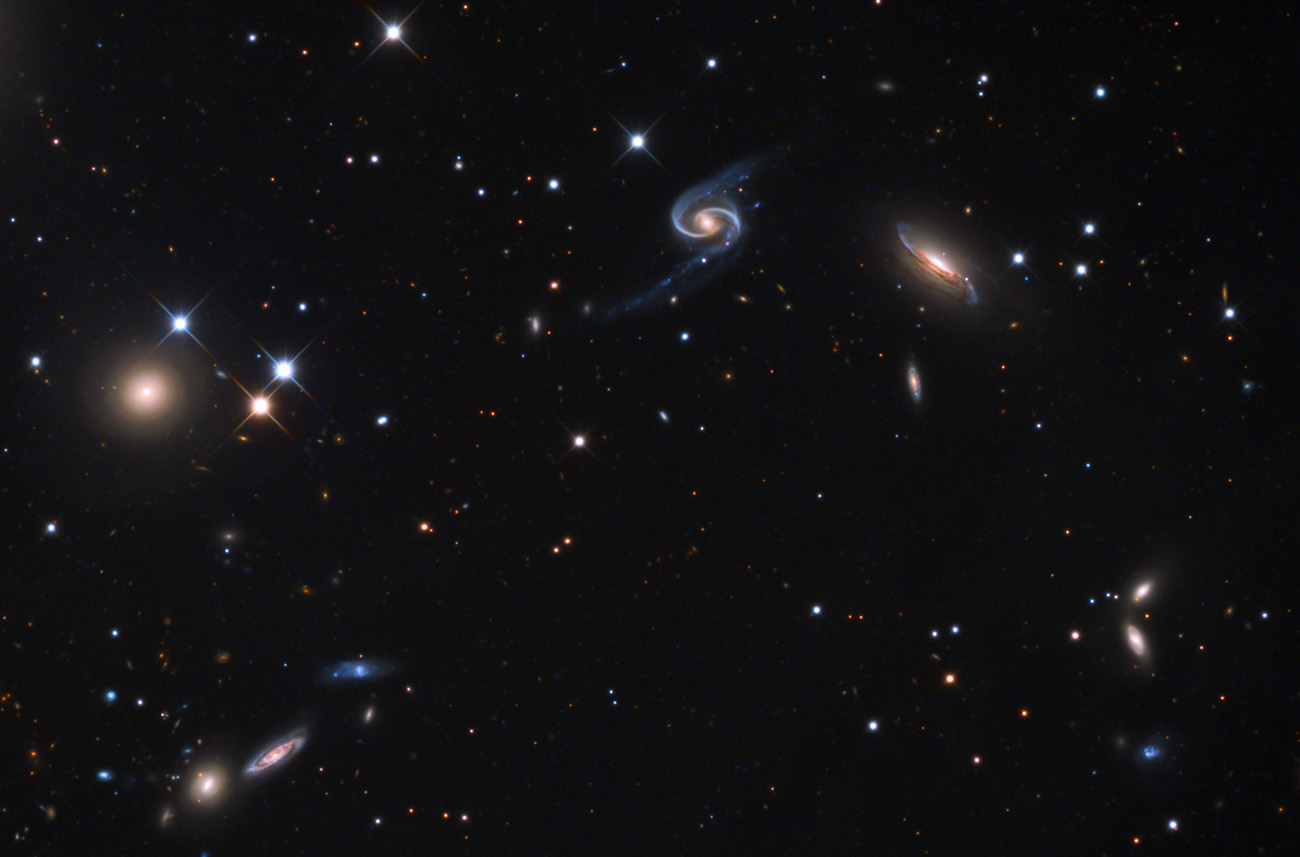
- NGC 93 (top right) and its spiral companion to the left, NGC 90

Observation data (J2000 epoch)
- Constellation: Andromeda
- Right ascension: 00^{h} 22^{m} 03.211^{s}
- Declination: +22° 24′ 29.15″
- Redshift: 0.017946
- Heliocentric radial velocity: 5380 ± 10 km/s
- Distance: 259.7 ± 68.1 Mly (79.633 ± 20.875 Mpc)
- Apparent magnitude (V): 14.34

Characteristics
- Type: S
- Apparent size (V): 1.4' x 0.7'

Other designations
- UGC 209, MCG+04-02-012,PGC 1412

NGC 93 is an interacting spiral galaxy estimated to be about 260 million light-years away in the constellation of Andromeda. It was discovered by R. J. Mitchell in 1854. The galaxy is currently interacting with NGC 90 and has some signs of interacting with it.

NGC 93 and NGC 90 form the interacting galaxy pair Arp 65.
