= NGC 85 =

Lenticular galaxy in the constellation Andromeda

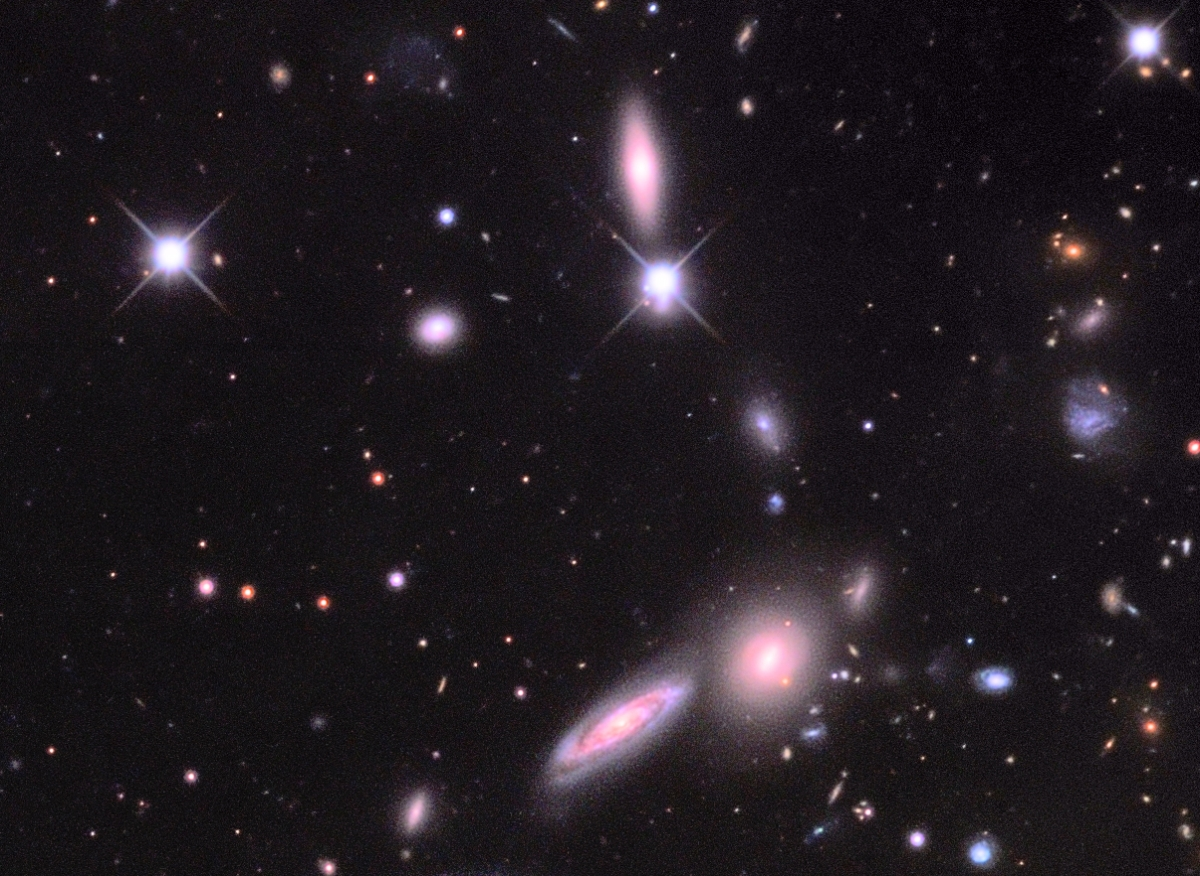
- NGC 85 is the bright galaxy on the lower right, next to the spiral galaxy IC 1546.

Observation data (J2000 epoch)
- Constellation: Andromeda
- Right ascension: 00^{h} 21^{m} 25.576^{s}
- Declination: +22° 30′ 42.11″
- Redshift: 0.020694
- Heliocentric radial velocity: 6204
- Distance: 183.3 Mly (56.20 Mpc)
- Apparent magnitude (B): 14.9

Characteristics
- Type: S0
- Size: 24,000 ly (7,360 pc)
- Apparent size (V): 0.45′ × 0.45′

Other designations
- MCG+04-02-007, PGC 1375

NGC 85 is an interacting spiral or lenticular galaxy estimated to be about 200 million light-years away in the constellation of Andromeda. It was discovered by Ralph Copeland in 1873 and its apparent magnitude is 15.7. The galaxy appears to be interacting with the companion spiral IC 1546.
