= NGC 71 =

Galaxy in the constellation Andromeda

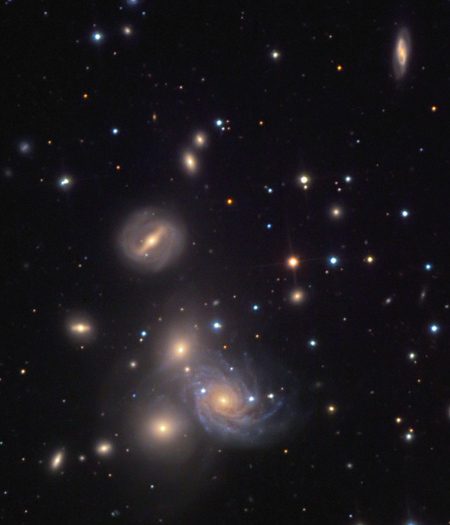
- NGC 71 is the elliptical galaxy directly above spiral galaxy NGC 70 (right) and NGC 68 (left), above NGC 71 is NGC 72, a barred spiral galaxy

Observation data (J2000.0 epoch)
- Constellation: Andromeda
- Right ascension: 00^{h} 18^{m} 23.57^{s}
- Declination: 30° 03′ 47.7″
- Redshift: 0.022339
- Heliocentric radial velocity: 6697 km/s
- Distance: 310 Mly (redshift); 300 Mly (F-J Law)
- Group or cluster: NGC 68 group
- Apparent magnitude (V): 13.2; 15.6

Characteristics
- Type: E5/S0
- Size: 110,000 ly 130,000
- Apparent size (V): 1.25'x0.8' 1.5'x1'

Other designations
- UGC 173, VV 166c, CGCG 499-107, CGCG 0015.8+2947, MCG +05-01-068, 2MASX J00182359+3003475, 2MASXi J0018235+300347, WBL 007-009, LDCE 0012 NED015, HDCE 0011 NED006, USGC U012 NED05, HOLM 006B, MAPS-PP O_1257_0202235B, PGC 1197, SRGb 062.056, UZC J001823.6+300348, RX J0018.3+3003, 1RXS J001823.8+300357 , RX J0018.3+3003:[BEV98] 002, VCV2001 J001823.5+300347, VCV2006 J001823.5+300347

NGC 71 is an elliptical galaxy located in the constellation Andromeda. It is in the NGC 68 group. The galaxy was discovered by R. J. Mitchell in 1855, and observed in 1865 by Heinrich d'Arrest, who described it as "extremely faint, very small, round". The galaxy is about 110,000–130,000 light years across, making it just slightly larger than the Milky Way. The galaxy is the second largest in the NGC 68 group, after spiral galaxy NGC 70.
