= NGC 81 =

Lenticular galaxy in the constellation Andromeda

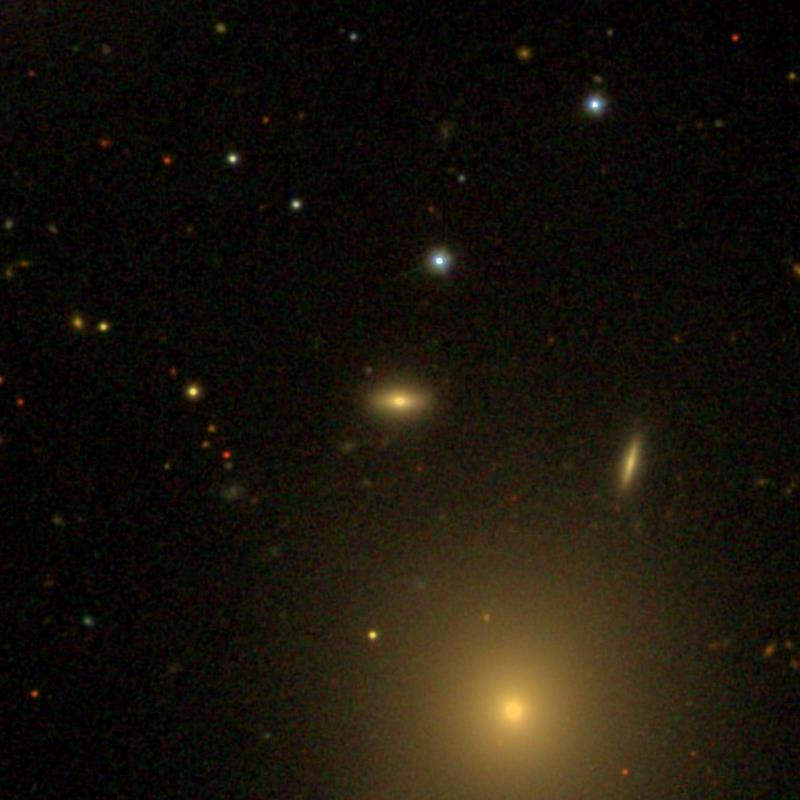
- SDSS image of NGC 81

Observation data (J2000 epoch)
- Constellation: Andromeda
- Right ascension: 00^{h} 21^{m} 13.314^{s}
- Declination: +22° 22′ 58.11″
- Redshift: 0.020447
- Heliocentric radial velocity: 6130
- Distance: 285 Mly (87 Mpc)
- Apparent magnitude (B): 17.74

Characteristics
- Type: S0
- Apparent size (V): 0.3′ × 0.15′

Other designations
- PGC 1352

NGC 81 is a lenticular galaxy estimated to be about 270 million light-years away in the constellation of Andromeda.
