= NGC 83 =

Elliptical galaxy in the constellation Andromeda

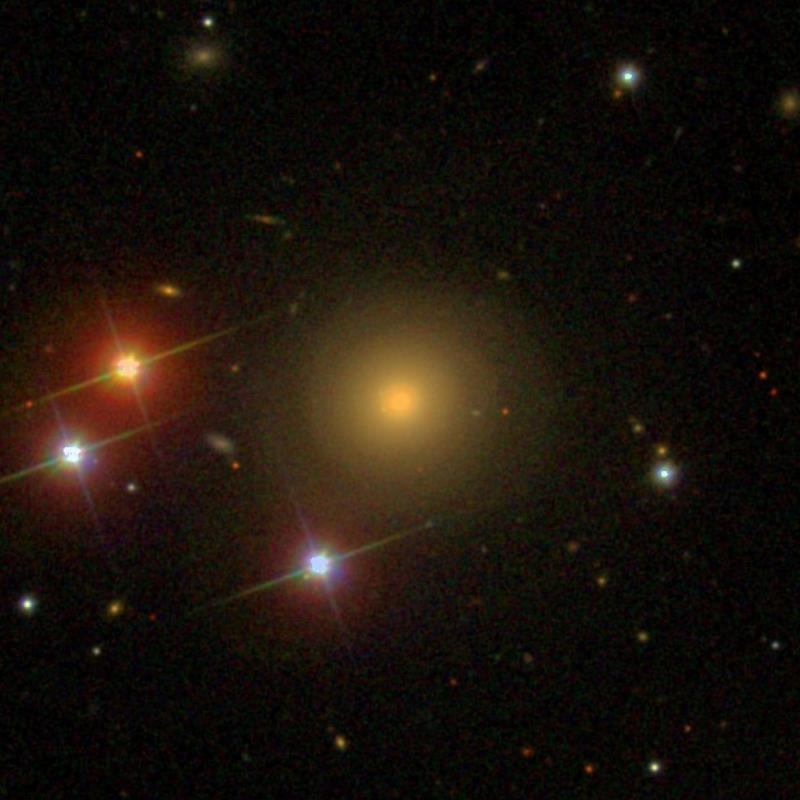
- SDSS image of NGC 83

Observation data (J2000 epoch)
- Constellation: Andromeda
- Right ascension: 00^{h} 21^{m} 22.399^{s}
- Declination: +22° 26′ 01.11″
- Redshift: 0.020514
- Heliocentric radial velocity: 6,150±16 km/s
- Distance: 289.42 ± 25.92 Mly (88.736 ± 7.948 Mpc)
- Apparent magnitude (V): 13.33
- Apparent magnitude (B): 14.3

Characteristics
- Type: E
- Size: 138,400 ly (42.42 kpc)
- Apparent size (V): 1.5′ × 1.5′

Other designations
- IRAS F00186+2209, UGC 206, MCG +04-02-005, PGC 1371, CGCG 479-008

NGC 83 is an elliptical galaxy estimated to be about 260 million light-years away in the constellation of Andromeda. It was discovered by British astronomer John Herschel on 17 August 1828, and its apparent magnitude is 14.2.

== Supernovae ==
Two supernovae have been observed in NGC 83:

- SN 2016eoa (Type Ia, mag. 19.3) was discovered by POSS on 2 August 2016.
- SN 2025wwk (Type Ia, mag. 17.75) was discovered by the Xingming Observatory Sky Survey (XOSS) on 3 September 2025.
