= NGC 70 =

Galaxy in the constellation Andromeda

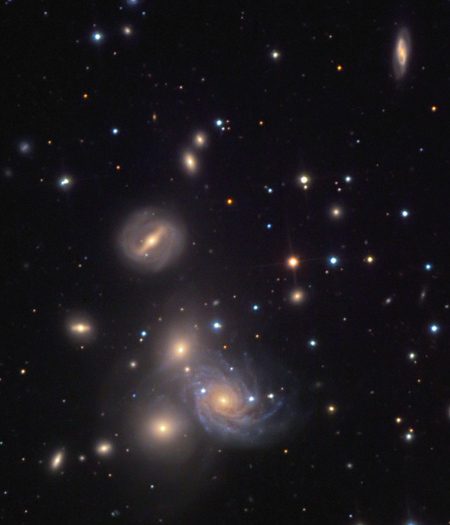
- NGC 70 is the spiral galaxy in the lower center of this image. The elliptical galaxies neighboring it are NGC 68 (lower) and NGC 71 (upper).

Observation data (J2000 epoch)
- Constellation: Andromeda
- Right ascension: 00^{h} 18^{m} 22.55^{s}
- Declination: +30^{h} 04^{m} 43.4^{s}
- Redshift: 0.023907
- Heliocentric radial velocity: 7167 km/s
- Distance: 320-325 Mly
- Apparent magnitude (V): 13.5

Characteristics
- Type: Sb Sbc SA(rs)c
- Size: ~200,000 ly (60.48 kpc) (estimated)
- Apparent size (V): ~1.7'x1.4'

Other designations
- IC 1539, UGC 174, Arp 113, VV 166a, MCG +05-01-067, 2MASX J00182252+3004465, IRAS 00157+2948, PGC 1194, UZC J001822.6+300446

NGC 70 is a spiral galaxy located in the constellation Andromeda. It was discovered on October 7, 1855, by R. J. Mitchell and was observed on December 19, 1897, by Guillaume Bigourdan from France who described it as "extremely faint, very small, round, between 2 faint stars".

NGC 70 hosts a Seyfert Type II Active galactic nucleus (AGN).

NGC 70 is a member of a compact group of seven or eight galaxies, sometimes called the NGC 70 Group or the VV 166 Group.

The group comprises three relatively bright galaxies: 70, 71 and 72 in the NGC catalog, and four fainter galaxies. NGC 68 appears to be a group member, but its discrepant radial velocity and lack of tidal distortion suggest that it may be an unrelated galaxy along the group's line of sight. In photographs, the NGC 70 group resembles the much more famous Stephan's Quintet group, and it is a popular target for amateur astrophotographers.

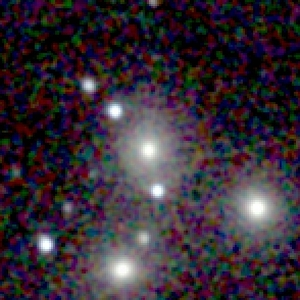
NGC 70 (near-infrared)
