= NGC 96 =

Lenticular galaxy in the constellation Andromeda

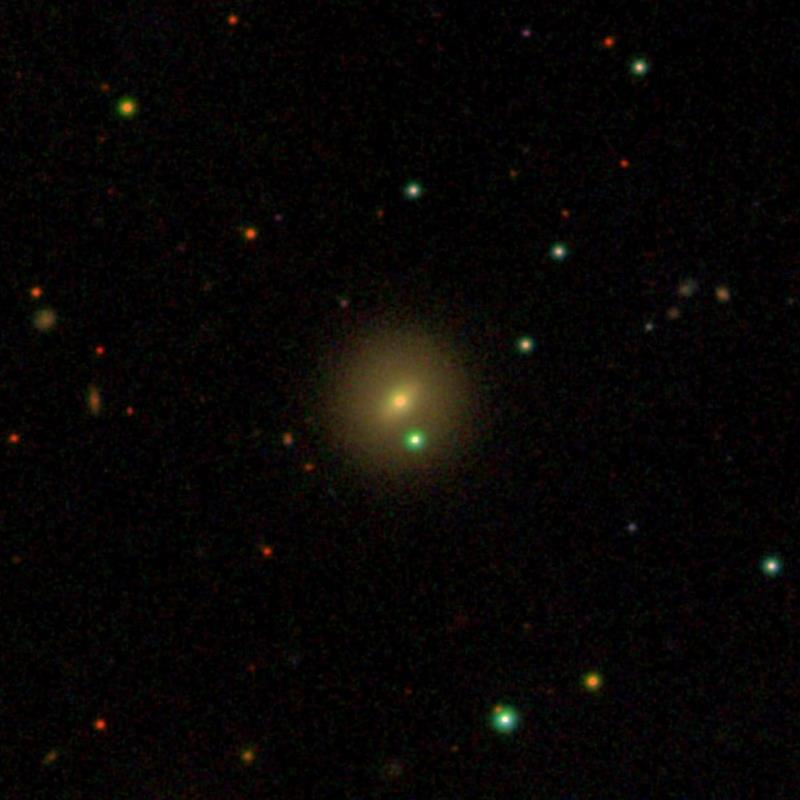
- SDSS image of NGC 96

Observation data (J2000 epoch)
- Constellation: Andromeda
- Right ascension: 00^{h} 22^{m} 17.697^{s}
- Declination: +22° 32′ 46.24″
- Redshift: 0.020631
- Heliocentric radial velocity: 6185
- Distance: 290 Mly (89 Mpc)
- Apparent magnitude (B): 17

Characteristics
- Type: S0
- Size: 39,400 ly (12,090 pc)
- Apparent size (V): 0.5′ × 0.5′

Other designations
- MCG+04-02-014, PGC 1429

NGC 96 is a lenticular galaxy estimated to be about 290 million light-years away in the constellation of Andromeda. It was discovered by Guillaume Bigourdan in 1884 and its apparent magnitude is 17.
