= NGC 68 =

Galaxy in the constellation Andromeda

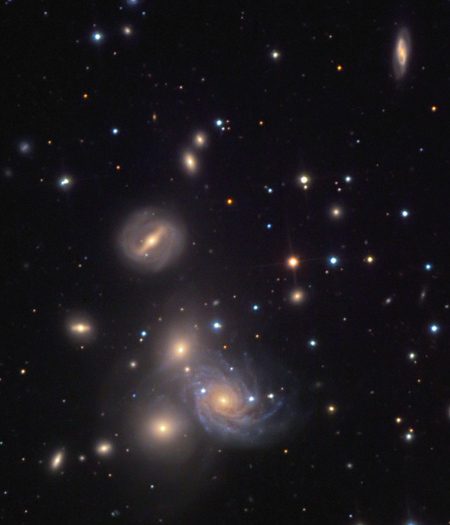
- NGC 68 is the elliptical galaxy located directly to the left of spiral galaxy NGC 70. Also in this photo is NGC 71 located directly above NGC 70 and NGC 68.

Observation data (J2000 epoch)
- Constellation: Andromeda
- Right ascension: 00^{h} 18^{m} 18.5^{s}
- Declination: 30° 04′ 18″
- Redshift: 0.01913
- Heliocentric radial velocity: 5735
- Distance: 260,000,000
- Group or cluster: NGC 68 group
- Apparent magnitude (V): 12.9

Characteristics
- Type: E1
- Size: 90,000 light years
- Apparent size (V): 1.288' x 1.202'

Other designations
- UGC 00170 VV 166b CGCG 499-106 CGCG 0015.7+2948 MCG +05-01-065 2MASX J00181851+3004185 WBL 007-008 USGC U012 NED07 HOLM 006A MAPS-PP O_1257_0202235C PGC 001187 SRGb 062.052 UZC J001818.4+300418

NGC 68 is a lenticular galaxy, and the central member of the NGC 68 group, in the constellation Andromeda. The galaxy was discovered on 11 September 1784 by William Herschel, who observed the NGC 68 group as a single object and described it as "extremely faint, large, 3 or 4 stars plus nebulosity". As such, his reported location is between NGC 68, NGC 70, and NGC 71. By the time Dreyer looked at the galaxies to add to the NGC catalog, however, he was able to tell that the single galaxy observed by Herschel was in fact 3 adjacent galaxies, and cataloged them as NGC 68, NGC 70, and NGC 71.
