= R. J. Mitchell (astronomer) =

Irish astronomer

R. J. Mitchell, active in astronomy in the 1850s, was an assistant to William Parsons, 3rd Earl of Rosse. He studied at Queen's College, Galway and was employed as a scientific assistant to Lord Rosse in 1853. He also taught the sons of Lord Rosse.

Mitchell was a talented observer and drawer who made many discoveries with Lord Rosse's 72-inch telescope, and it has been suggested that many of the discoveries claimed by Lord Rosse were actually made by Mitchell. After leaving the employ of Lord Rosse in May 1858, Mitchell began a career in the Irish civil service.
