= HD 85951 =

Star in the constellation of Hydra

- Location of HD 85951 (circled in red)

Observation data Epoch J2000.0 Equinox ICRS
- Constellation: Hydra
- Right ascension: 09^{h} 54^{m} 52.2045^{s}
- Declination: −19° 00′ 33.620″
- Apparent magnitude (V): 4.94

Characteristics
- Evolutionary stage: AGB
- Spectral type: K5 III
- U−B color index: +1.93
- B−V color index: +1.57

Astrometry
Radial velocity (R_{v})	50±4.2 km/s
Proper motion (μ)	RA: −45.386 mas/yr Dec.: −40.456 mas/yr
Parallax (π)	5.6789±0.2214 mas
Distance	570 ± 20 ly (176 ± 7 pc)
Absolute magnitude (M_{V})	−1.43

Details
Mass	6.40^{+1.2}_{−0.4} M_{☉}
Radius	56.7 R_{☉}
Luminosity	721±32 L_{☉}
Surface gravity (log g)	1.3±0.04 cgs
Temperature	3,875±39 K
Metallicity [Fe/H]	−0.18±0.07 dex

Other designations
- Felis, 183 G. Hydrae, BD−18°2810, FK5 373, GC 13644, HD 85951, HIP 48615, HR 3923, SAO 155588

Database references
SIMBAD	data

HD 85951 (HR 3923), formally named Felis /ˈfiːlɪs/, is a solitary orange-hued star in the constellation Hydra. It has an apparent magnitude of 4.94, making it faintly visible to the naked eye under ideal conditions. Based on parallax measurements, the object is about 570 light-years away from the Sun and is receding with a heliocentric radial velocity of 50 km/s.

== Nomenclature ==
HD 85951 was the brightest star in the now-obsolete constellation of Felis, and was designated c Felis in Bode's star chart. In 2016, the IAU organized a Working Group on Star Names (WGSN) to catalog and standardize proper names for stars. The WGSN approved the name Felis for this star on 1 June 2018 and it is now so included in the List of IAU-approved Star Names.

== Properties ==
HD 85951 is an evolved red giant with a stellar classification of K5 III. It is currently on the asymptotic giant branch, generating energy via fusion of hydrogen and helium shells around an inert carbon core. At present, Felis has 6.4 times the mass of the Sun and, due to its evolved status, has an enlarged radius of 56.7 R_{☉}. It radiates at a bolometric luminosity 721 times that of the Sun from its photosphere at an effective temperature of 3,875 K. Felis has an iron abundance 66% that of the Sun, making it metal deficient.
