= Felis (constellation) =

Former constellation

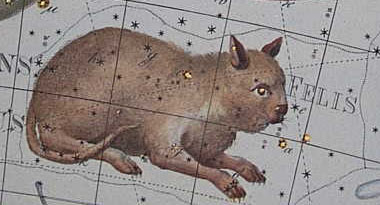
Felis

Felis (Latin for cat) was a constellation created by French astronomer Jérôme Lalande in 1799. He chose the name partly because, as a cat lover, he felt sorry that there was not yet a cat among the constellations (although there are two lions and a lynx). It was between the constellations of Antlia and Hydra.

This constellation was first depicted in the Uranographia sive Astrorum Descriptio (1801) of Johann Elert Bode. It is now obsolete.

Its brightest star, HD 85951, was named Felis by the International Astronomical Union on 1 June 2018 and it is now so included in the List of IAU-approved Star Names.

== See also ==
- Former constellations
