= Former constellations =

Constellations that are no longer widely recognised

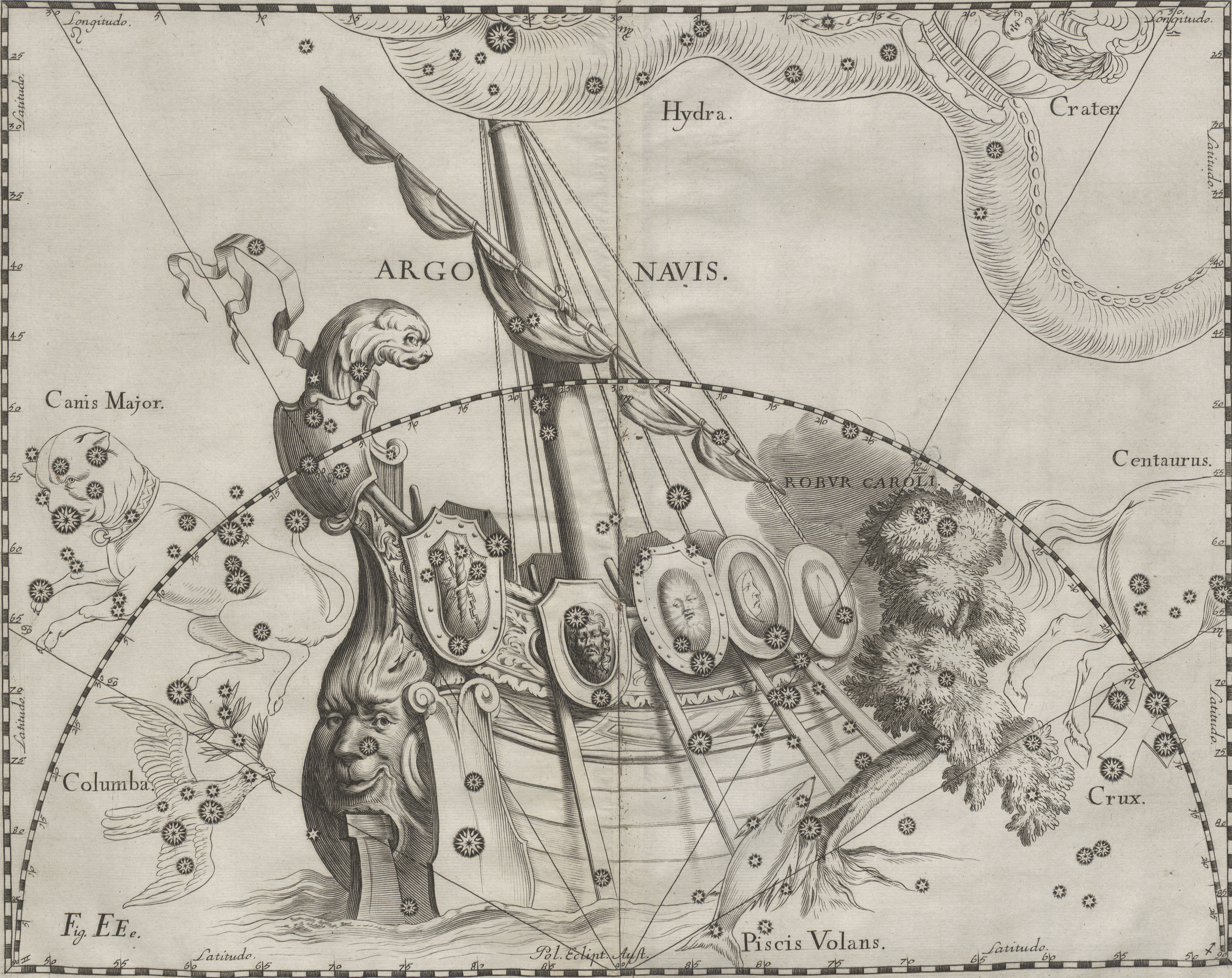
The former constellation Argo Navis

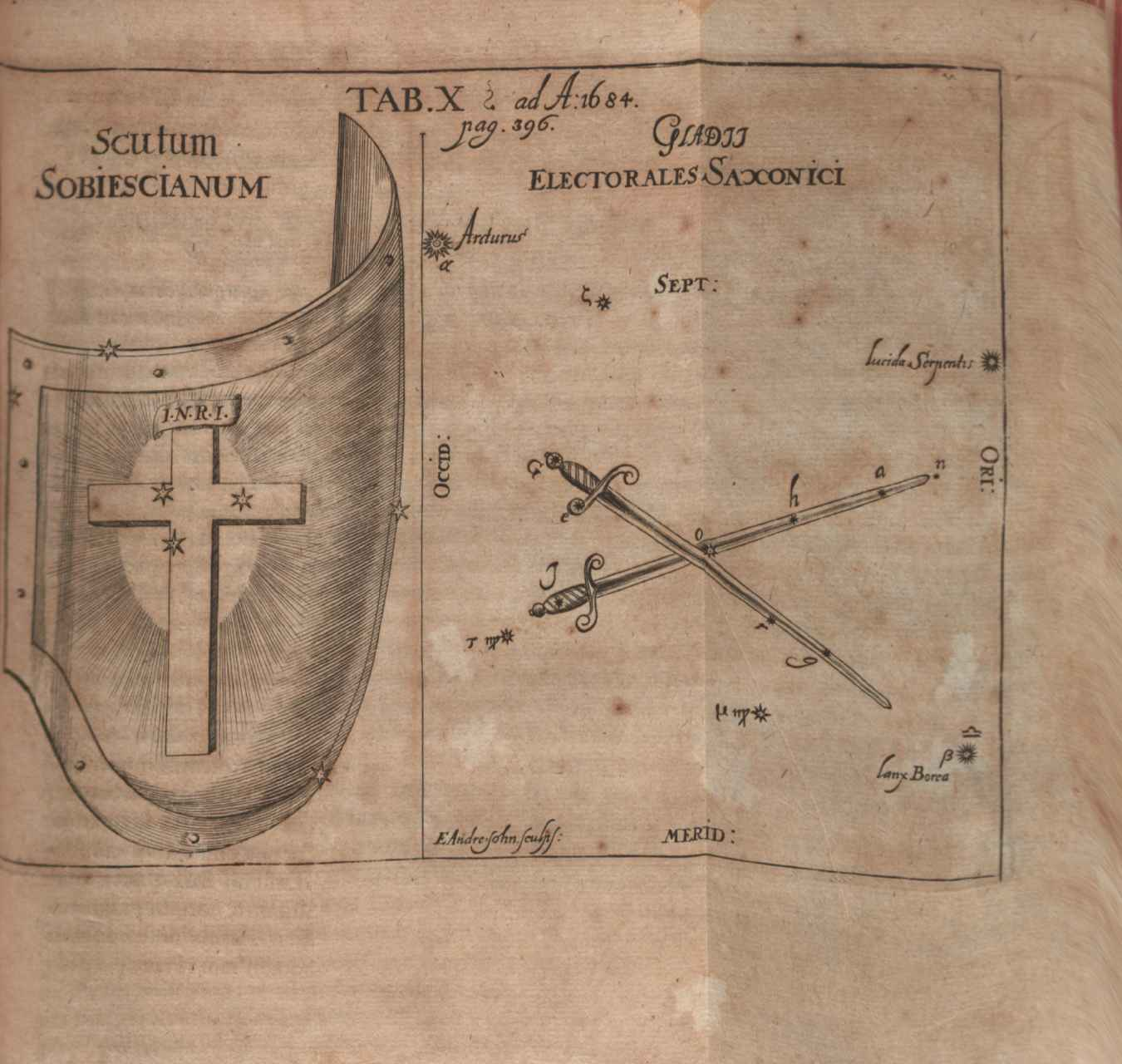
Gladii Saxonici from 1684 Acta Eruditorum

Former constellations are old historical Western constellations that for various reasons are no longer widely recognised or are not officially recognised by the International Astronomical Union (IAU). Prior to 1930, many of these defunct constellations were traditional in one or more countries or cultures. Some only lasted decades but others were referred to over many centuries. All are now recognised only for having classical or historical value. Many former constellations had complex Latinised names after objects, people, or mythological or zoological creatures. Others with unwieldy names were shortened for convenience. For example, Scutum Sobiescianum was reduced to Scutum, Mons Mensae to Mensa, and Apparatus Sculptoris to Sculptor.

Some of the Northern Sky's former constellations were placed in the less populated regions between the traditional brighter constellations just to fill gaps. In the Southern Sky, new constellations were often created from about the 15th century by voyagers who began journeying south of the Equator. European countries like England, France, the Netherlands, German or Italian states, etc., often supported and popularised their own constellation outlines. In some cases, different constellations occupied overlapping areas and included the same stars. These former constellations are often found in older books, star charts, or star catalogues.

The 88 modern constellation names and boundaries were standardised by Eugene Delporte for the IAU in 1930, under an international agreement, removing any possible astronomical ambiguities between astronomers from different countries. Nearly all former or defunct constellations differ in their designated boundaries inasmuch as they have outlines that do not follow the exact lines of right ascension and declination.

== Noteworthy former constellations ==
=== Antinous ===
Antinous was mentioned by Ptolemy in the Almagest as a subdivision of Aquila, and was widely shown on star charts until the IAU reorganization of the constellations in 1922.

=== Argo Navis ===
Argo Navis is the only constellation from Ptolemy's original list of 48 constellations that is no longer officially recognized. Due to its large size, it was split into three constellations by Nicolas Louis de Lacaille: Carina (the keel), Puppis (the poop deck), and Vela (the sails). The new constellations were introduced in the 1763 star catalog Coelum Australe Stelliferum, which was published soon after Lacaille's death.

=== Quadrans Muralis ===
Quadrans Muralis was originally created in 1795, placed in the northern skies between the still-accepted constellations Boötes and Draco. The Quadrantids meteor shower is named after this former constellation.

=== Remnant nomenclature ===
Starting in 2017, the IAU Working Group on Star Names has named a number of stars after former constellations:

- 53 Eridani A is named Sceptrum from the former constellation Sceptrum Brandenburgicum; this star name was already in use since the 19th century.
- α Vulpeculae is named Anser from the former constellation Vulpecula et Anser ("the little fox and the goose").
- HD 85951 is named Felis from the former constellation Felis.
- θ Aquilae A is named Antinous from the former constellation Antinous.
- 58 Hydrae is named Solitaire from the former constellation Turdus Solitarius.
- 44 Boötis A is named Quadrans from the former constellation Quadrans Muralis.
- 7 Andromedae is named Honores from the former constellation Honores Friderici.
- 102 Herculis is named Ramus from the former constellation Ramus Pomifer (Cerberus et Ramus).
- ι Trianguli Aa is named Triminus from the former constellation Triangulum Minus.
- 49 Cassiopeiae A and 2 Ursae Minoris are named Rangifer and Tarandus, from the former constellation Rangifer, also known as Tarandus.
- BE Camelopardalis is named Custos from the former constellation Custos Messium.
- 109 Virginis is named Maenalus from the former constellation Mons Maenalus.
- ε Microscopii is named Aerostaticus from the former constellation Globus Aerostaticus.
- 25 Canum Venaticorum A is named Jordanus from the former constellation Jordanus.

== List of former constellations ==
The following table is compiled from historical and modern astronomical reference works, drawing especially on Richard Hinckley Allen's Star-Names and Their Lore and Meaning, Ian Ridpath's Star Tales, and later scholarly studies, including John C. Barentine's The Lost Constellations.

Name	Genitive	Meaning	Date created	Created by	Notable stars	Position	Depiction
Anguilla	Anguillae	Eel	1754	John Hill	ε Equulei, ε, κ Delphini, 66 Aquilae, υ Sagittarii, α, δ, ε Scuti	between Equuleus, Delphinus, Aquila and Serpens	
Anser Americanus	Anseris Americani	American Goose	1627	Johannes Kepler	List	Alternative name for Tucana	
Antinous	Antinoi	Antinous	132	Emperor Hadrian	δ, η, θ, ι, κ, λ and ν Aquilae	Southern Aquila	
Apes	Apium	Bees (renamed to Vespa, then Lilium, then to Musca Borealis)	1612	Petrus Plancius	33, 35 Arietis, Lilli Borea and Bharani	between Perseus and Aries	
Apis	Apis	Bee (obsolete name and renamed to Musca Australis, and then shortened to Musca)	1598	Petrus Plancius	List	where Musca is now	
Aranea	Araneae	Long-Legged Spider	1754	John Hill	53, 55, 57, 61, 63, 68, 69, 75, 83, 87, y Virginis and HD 120544	between Virgo and Corvus	
Argo Navis	Argus Navis	The Ship Argo (now divided into Carina, Puppis, and Vela)	2nd century	Claudius Ptolemy	List (Carina, Puppis, Vela)	where Carina, Puppis and Vela reside now	
Aselli and Praesepe	Asellorum, Praesepis	Dionysus's Asses (Asellus Borealis and Asellus Australis) and Manger (Beehive Cluster)	3rd century BC	Aratus	Asellus Borealis and Asellus Australis	middle part of Cancer	
Asterion and Chara	Asterii, Charae	Northern and Southern Dogs in Canes Venatici	1690	Johannes Hevelius.	Cor Caroli and β Canum Venaticorum	where Canes Venatici is now	
Battery of Volta		Battery	1807	Thomas Young	1 and 9 Pegasi	between Delphinus and Pegasus	
Bufo	Bufonis	Toad	1754	John Hill	58 Hydrae, Sigma Librae	tail of Hydra	
Cancer Minor	Cancri Minoris	Lesser Crab	1613	Petrus Plancius	68, 74, 81, 85 Geminorum and HIP 36616	south-western Gemini	
Capra and Haedi	Caprae, Haedorum	Goat Amalthea (stars surrounding Capella) and the Kids (Haedus I and Haedus II)	3rd century BC	Aratus	ζ and η Aurigae	eastern Auriga	
Caesaris Thronus	Caesaris Throni	Throne of Caesar	44 BC	Augustus Caesar		North of Cancer	
Cerberus	Cerberi	Cerberus (guardian dog of Hades)	1690	Johannes Hevelius	93, 95, 102 ‍and ‍109 Herculis	eastern Hercules	
Cor Caroli Regis Martyris	Cordis Caroli	Charles's Heart	1673	Charles Scarborough	Cor Caroli	central Canes Venatici	
Corona Firmiana	Coronae Firmianae	Corona Borealis renamed to honor Count Leopold Anton von Firmian	1730	Corbinianus Thomas	List	where Corona Borealis is now	
Custos Messium	Custodis Messium	Keeper of harvests	1775	Jérôme Lalande	23, 47, 49, 50 Cassiopeiae, γ, CS Camelopardalis	between Cassiopeia and Camelopardalis	
Deltoton	Deltoti	Delta (obsolete name for Triangulum Boreale)	1540	Petrus Apianus	Mothallah, β and γ Trianguli	Triangulum	
Dentalium	Dentalii	Tooth Shell	1754	John Hill	69, 71 Aquilae, 4, 11, 12, 15, 16 and 21 Aquarii	between Aquila and Aquarius	
Duae Alae	Duarum Alarum	Two Wings	1532	Petrus Apianus		Between Cygnus and Draco	
Felis	Felis	Cat	1799	Jérôme Lalande	G, I Hydrae, Felis, HD 82573 and HD 78702	southern Hydra	
Frederici Honores	Frederici Honorum	Frederick's Honors	1787	Johann Elert Bode	ι, κ, λ, ο, and ψ Andromedae	Northeastern Andromeda	
Gallus	Galli	Rooster	1613	Petrus Plancius	η Canis Majoris, τ Canis Majoris, and HD 56342	Northern Puppis	
Gladii Electorales Saxonici	Gladiorum Electoralium Saxonicorum	Crossed Swords of the Electorate of Saxony	1684	Gottfried Kirch		Between Boötes, Leo, Scutum, and Virgo	
Globus Aerostaticus	Globi Aerostatici	Hot air balloon	1798	Jérôme Lalande			
Gryphites	Gryphitis	Gryphaea shellfish	1754	John Hill			
Hippocampus	Hippocampi	Sea Horse	1754	John Hill		Between Eridanus, Taurus, and Cetus	
Hirudo	Hirudinis	Leech	1754	John Hill		Northern Orion	
Jordanus	Jordani	River Jordan	1613	Petrus Plancius			
Leo Palatinus	Leonis Palatini	Lion to honor the Elector Palatine Charles Theodore and his wife Elisabeth Auguste	1785	Karl-Joseph König			
Lilium	Lilii	Fleur de Lys (renamed Musca Borealis)	1679	Augustin Royer/P. Anthelme			
Limax	Limacis	Slug	1754	John Hill			
Linum Piscium	Lini Piscium	The line connecting the fish (renamed by Bode in 1801 from Hevelius's Linum Austrinum and Linum Boreum; known as Lineola too)	1590	Thomas Hood			
Lochium Funis	Lochii Funis	Log line (renamed Linea Nautica in 1888 by Eliza A. Bowen)	1801	Johann Elert Bode			
Lumbricus	Lumbrici	Earthworm	1754	John Hill			
Machina Electrica	Machinae Electricae	Electricity generator	1800	Johann Elert Bode			
Malus	Mali	Mast	1844	John Herschel	List	Where Pyxis is now	
Manis	Manis	Pangolin	1754	John Hill		Between Andromeda, Lacerta, and Cygnus	
Marmor Sculptile	Marmoris Sculptilis	Bust of Columbus	1810	William Croswell			
Mons Maenalus	Montis Maenali	Mount Mainalo	1690	Johannes Hevelius		Southern Boötes	
Musca Borealis	Muscae Borealis	Northern Fly	1690	Johannes Hevelius			
Noctua	Noctuae	Owl	1822	Alexander Jamieson			
Norma Nilotica	Normae Niloticae	Nilometer	1822	Alexander Jamieson		Western edge of Aquarius	
Nubecula Major and Nubecula Minor	Nubeculae Majoris, Nubeculae Minoris	Magellanic Clouds	1603	Johann Bayer			
Officina Typographica	Officinae Typographicae	Printshop	1801	Johann Elert Bode			
Patella	Patellae	Limpet	1754	John Hill			
Phaethon	Phaethontis	Phaethon	Middle Ages	Aratus/Hyginus			
Phoenicopterus	Phoenicopteri	Flamingo (an obsolete name for Grus)	early 17th century	Petrus Plancius/Paulus Merula	List	where Grus is now	
Pinna Marina	Pinnae Marinae	Mussel	1754	John Hill			
Piscis Notus	Piscis Noti	Southern Fish (obsolete name for Piscis Austrinus)	3rd century BC	Aratus	List	where Piscis Austrinus is now	
Plaustrum	Plaustri	Chariot with 3 horses	1524	Petrus Apianus	List	Big Dipper	
Pluteum	Plutei	Parapet (obsolete for Pictor)	1881	Richard Andree	List	where Pictor is now	
Polophylax	Polophylacis	Guardian of the Pole	1592	Petrus Plancius			
Pomum Imperiale	Pomi Imperialis	Leopold's orb	1688	Gottfried Kirch			
Psalterium Georgii	Psalterii Georgii	George's Psaltery (renamed to Harp Georgii by Lalande)	1781	Maximilian Hell			
Quadrans Muralis	Quadrantis Muralis	Mural Quadrant	1795	Jérôme Lalande			
Quadratum	Quadrati	Rhombus (obsolete name for Reticulum Rhomboidalis)	1706	Carel Allard			
Quinque Dromedarii	Quinque Dromedariorum	Five Camels	1532	Petrus Apianus	β, γ, μ, ν and ξ Draconis	Southern Draco	
Ramus Pomifer	Rami Pomiferi	Apple-bearing Branch	1690	Johannes Hevelius			
Robur Carolinum	Roboris Carolini	Charles' Oak	1679	Edmund Halley			
Rosa	Rosae	Rose	1536	Petrus Apianus			
Sagitta Australis	Sagittae Australis	Southern Arrow	1613	Petrus Plancius			
Scarabaeus	Scarabaei	Rhinoceros Beetle	1754	John Hill			
Sceptrum Brandenburgicum	Sceptri Brandenburgici	Scepter of Brandenburg	1688	Gottfried Kirch			
Sceptrum et Manus Iustitiae	Sceptri et Manus Iustitiae	Scepter and Hand of Justice	1679	Augustin Royer	ι, κ, λ, ο, and ψ Andromedae	Northeastern Andromeda, where Honores Fredirici was	
Sciurus Volans	Sciuri Volantis	Flying Squirrel (now part of Camelopardalis)	1810	William Croswell			
Sextans Uraniae	Sextantis Uraniae	Urania's Sextant (obsolete name for Sextans)	1690	Johannes Hevelius			
Siren, Ceneus and Lang		Siren, Lapith Caeneus and Lang	early 17th century	Unknown/Willem Jansz Blaeu		where Chamaeleon, Musca, Tucana and Triangulum Australe now are	
Solarium	Solarii	Sundial	1822	Alexander Jamieson		Replacement for Reticulum	
Sudarium Veronicae	Sudarii Veronicae	Sudarium of Veronica	1643	Antoine Marie Schyrle de Rheita	ο Leonis, ρ Leonis, β Sextantis, and ι Hydrae	Between Leo, Hydra, and Sextans.	
Tarabellum and Vexillum	Tarabelli, Vexilli	Drill and flag-like Standard	12th century	Michael Scot		Between Leo, and Virgo	
Tarandus or Rangifer	Tarandi, Rangiferi	Reindeer	1736	Pierre Charles Lemonnier		Between Cassiopeia, and Camelopardalis	
Taurus Poniatovii	Tauri Poniatovii	Poniatowski's Bull	1777	Marcin Poczobut			
Telescopium Herschelii	Telescopii Herschelii	Herschel's Telescope (renamed from Tubus Herschelii Major by Bode in 1801)	1781	Maximilian Hell			
Turris Eiffel	Turris	Eiffel Tower	1922	Ezequiel de Moraes Leme	η Centauri, κ Centauri, β Lupi, δ Lupi, and ε Lupi	Between Centaurus and Lupus	
Testudo	Testudinis	Tortoise	1754	John Hill	13 Ceti, 14 Ceti, 20 Ceti, 42 Ceti, 27 Piscium, and 29 Piscium	Between Cetus and Pisces	
Tigris	Tigridis	Tigris River	1613	Petrus Plancius			
Triangulum Majus	Trianguli Majoris	Large Triangle (obsolete name for Triangulum)	1690	Johannes Hevelius	List	where Triangulum is now	
Triangulum Minus	Trianguli Minoris	Small Triangle	1690	Johannes Hevelius			
Triangulus Antarcticus	Trianguli Antarctici	Obsolete name for Triangulum Australe	1589	Petrus Plancius			
Tubus Herschelii Minor	Tubi Herschelii Minoris	Herschel's Reflector	1781	Maximilian Hell			
Turdus Solitarius	Turdi Solitarii	Solitary Thrush (renamed to Mocking Bird and then to Noctua). Named in honor of the Rodrigues solitaire, an extinct flightless bird related to the dodo.	1776	Pierre Charles Lemonnier			
Uranoscopus	Uranoscopi	Star-Gazer fish	1754	John Hill			
Urna	Urnae	Urn of Aquarius	1596	Zacharias Bornmann			
Vespa	Vespae	Wasp (an obsolete name for Musca Borealis)	1624	Jakob Bartsch			
Xiphias	Xiphiae	Swordfish (An obsolete name for Dorado)	1627	Johannes Kepler	List	Where Dorado is now	
Triangula, Triangulum, Catuli, Corona, Corolla, Piscis, Camelus, Vulpes, Equus, Delphin, Ursa Minor, Canis, Felis, Leaena and Cervus	Triangulae, Trianguli, Catulorum, Coronae, Corollae, Piscis, Cameli, Vulpis, Equi, Delphinis, Ursae Minoris, Canis, Felis, Leaenae, Cervi	Obsolete names for Triangulum Boreale, Triangulum Australe, Canes Venatici, Corona Borealis, Corona Australis, Piscis Australis, Cameleopardalis, Vulpecula et Anser, Equuleus, Delphinus, Ursa Major, Ursa Minor, Canis Major, Canis Minor, Leo Minor and Monoceros	1873	Richard Proctor			

== See also ==
- Asterism
- Lists of constellations
- Julius Schiller's Coelum Stellatum Christianum (1627, "Christian Starry Sky") renamed the pagan constellations with new names after Christian figures.
