= Mu Arietis =

Star system in the constellation Aries

μ Arietis
- Location of μ Arietis (circled)

Observation data Epoch J2000 Equinox ICRS
- Constellation: Aries
- Right ascension: 02^{h} 42^{m} 21.936^{s}
- Declination: +20° 00′ 41.28″
- Apparent magnitude (V): 5.74 (6.38/8.38/6.72/12.2)

Characteristics
- Spectral type: A0 Vp + F2 V + A1 V
- U−B color index: −0.03
- B−V color index: −0.02

Astrometry
Radial velocity (R_{v})	−6.0 km/s
Proper motion (μ)	RA: +29.086 mas/yr Dec.: −46.133 mas/yr
Parallax (π)	7.5702±0.1425 mas
Distance	431 ± 8 ly (132 ± 2 pc)
Absolute magnitude (M_{V})	+0.41

Orbit
Primary	Aa
Name	Ab
Period (P)	8.868±0.016 yr
Semi-major axis (a)	0.05467±0.00067″
Eccentricity (e)	0.3767±0.0087
Inclination (i)	71.50±0.62°
Longitude of the node (Ω)	101.07±0.75°
Periastron epoch (T)	1981.133±0.089
Argument of periastron (ω) (secondary)	96.0±3.4°

Details

μ Ari Aa
Mass	3.4±1.7 M_{☉}
Luminosity	71.7 L_{☉}
Rotational velocity (v sin i)	175 km/s

μ Ari Ab
Mass	2.1±1.7 M_{☉}

Other designations
- μ Ari, 34 Arietis, BD+19 403, GC 3256, HD 16811, HIP 12640, HR 793, SAO 93062, PPM 91916, WDS J02424+2001

Database references
SIMBAD	data

Mu Arietis is a multiple star system in the northern constellation of Aries. Its name is a Bayer designation that is Latinized from μ Arietis, and abbreviated Mu Ari or μ Ari. This system is approximately 431 light-years (132 parsecs) distant from Earth, give or take a 8 light-year margin of error, and has a combined apparent visual magnitude of 5.74. According to the Bortle Dark-Sky Scale, this means it is faintly visible to the naked eye from dark suburban skies. The system is positioned near the ecliptic and is subject to lunar occultation.

At the heart of this system is a close orbiting pair, designated μ Ari Aa, consisting of a magnitude 6.38 A-type main sequence star with a stellar classification of A0 Vp, and a magnitude 8.38 F-type main sequence companion with a classification of F2 V. These two components have an angular separation of 0.04 arcseconds. A third component, designated μ Ari Ab, consists of a magnitude 6.72 star with a classification of A1 V, orbiting the inner pair with a period of 8.845 years and an eccentricity of 0.34. The orbit of this star has been measured using lunar occultations. A smaller fourth component, μ Ari B, at an angular separation of 19.1 arcseconds, has a magnitude of 12.2.

According to R. H. Allen's Star Names, μ Ari together with the stars of Musca Borealis (33 Ari, 35 Ari, 39 Ari, and 41 Ari) formed the Coptic asterism Koleōn, "the Belly, or Scabbard". A 1971 NASA catalog of star names listed μ Ari with the name Koleon.
