= Jakob Bartsch =

German astronomer

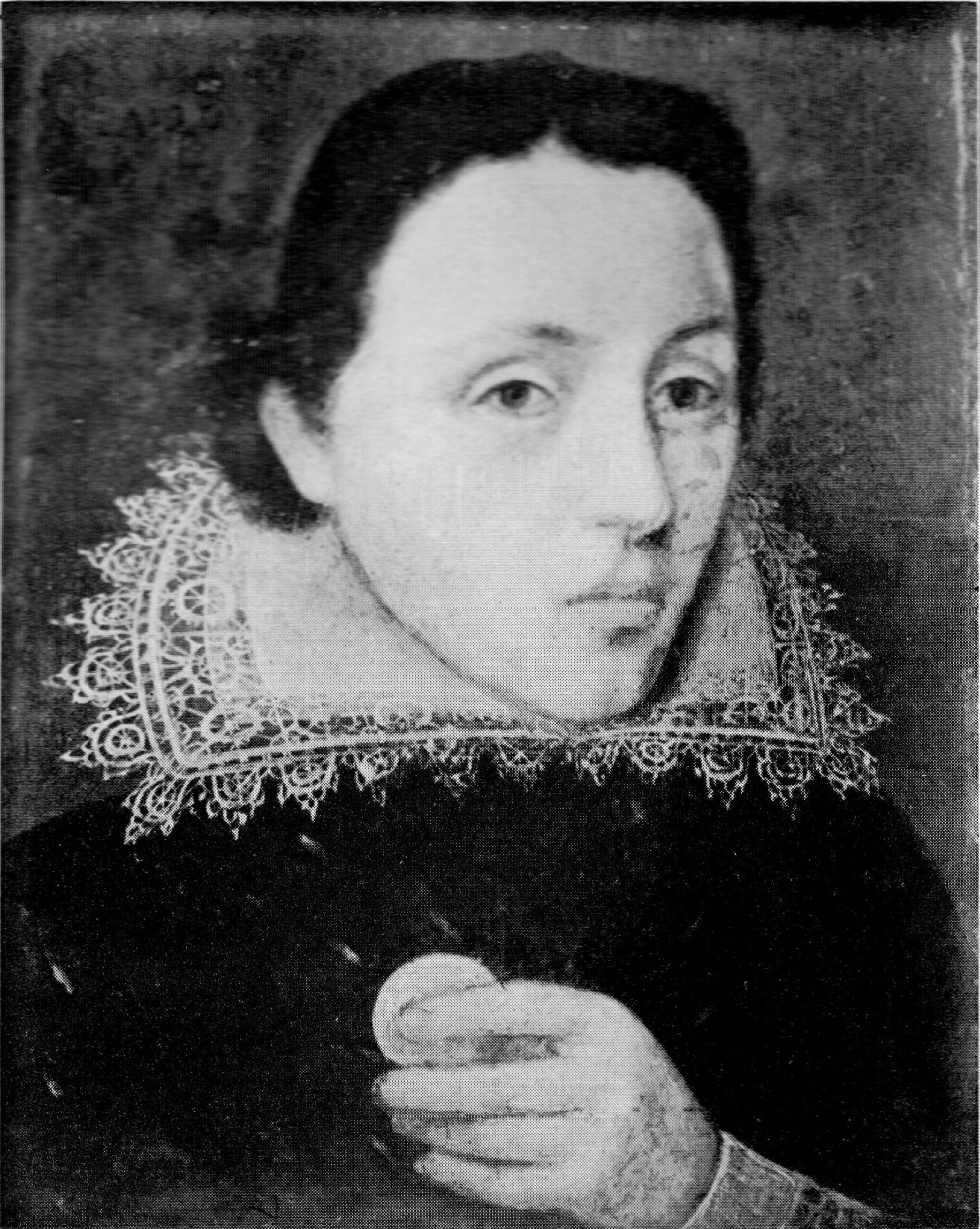
Jakob Bartsch

Jakob Bartsch or Jacobus Bartschius (c. 1600 – 26 December 1633) was a German astronomer.

== Biography ==
Bartsch was born in Lauban (Lubań) in Lusatia. He was taught how to use the astrolabe by Sarcephalus (Christopher Hauptfleisch), a librarian in Breslau (Wrocław). He also studied astronomy and medicine at the University of Strassburg (Strasbourg).

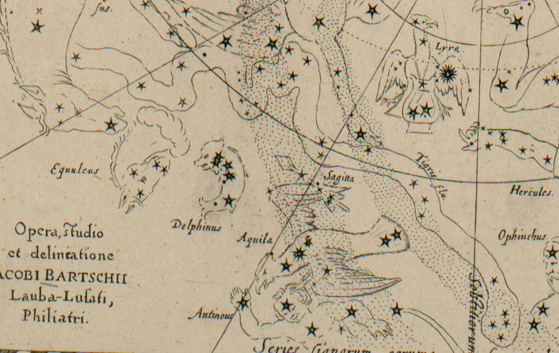
Tigris, a constellation introduced around 1613 by Petrus Plancius, as depicted by Jakob Bartsch

In 1624 Bartsch published a book titled Usus astronomicus planisphaerii stellati containing star charts that depicted six new constellations introduced around 1613 by Petrus Plancius on a celestial globe published by Pieter van den Keere. These six new constellations were Camelopardalis, Gallus, Jordanis, Monoceros (which he called Unicornu), Tigris and Vespa. He also mentioned but did not depict Rhombus, a separate invention by Isaac Habrecht II. Bartsch was often wrongly credited with having invented these figures. Only Camelopardalis and Monoceros survive today.

Bartsch married Johannes Kepler's daughter Susanna on 12 March 1630 and helped Kepler with his calculations. After Kepler's death in 1630, Bartsch edited Kepler's posthumous work Somnium. He also helped gather money from Kepler's estate for his widow.

Bartsch died in Lauban in 1633.

== Related quotes ==
if there is anything that can bind the heavenly mind of man to this dusty exile of our earthy home and can reconcile us with our fate so that we can enjoy living – then it is verily the enjoyment of ... the mathematical sciences and astronomy.

— Johannes Kepler in a letter to Bartsch
