= Bharani =

2nd lunar mansion of Hindu astrology

Aries (constellation) map showing Bharani

Bharani (Devanagari: भरणी), meaning "the bearer", is the second nakshatra (lunar mansion) in Hindu astronomy, corresponding to the three stars 35, 39, and 41 Arietis. The brightest of these stars, 41 Arietis, has the modern name Bharani after the nakshatra.

The same group of stars formed the historical European constellation called Musca Borealis or Lilium.

== Astrology ==
In Jyotiṣa, Bharani is ruled by Shukra (the planet Venus). Also, it is classified as a Cruel or Active nakshatra, meaning that, under electional astrological beliefs, works of a harmful or deceptive nature are best conducted while the moon is Bharani.

Bharani is seen as being under the domain of Yama, the god of death or Kālī.

Traditional Hindu given names are determined by which pada (quarter) of a nakshatra the Ascendant/Lagna was in at the time of birth. The given name would begin with the following syllables:

- A (pronounced as in "agglutination")
- Ee (pronounced as in "Eel")
- Li (pronounced as in "little")
- Lu (pronounced as in "look")
- Le (pronounced as in "levity")
- Lo (pronounced as in "local")

== See also ==
- List of Nakshatras
