= Norma Nilotica =

Former constellation

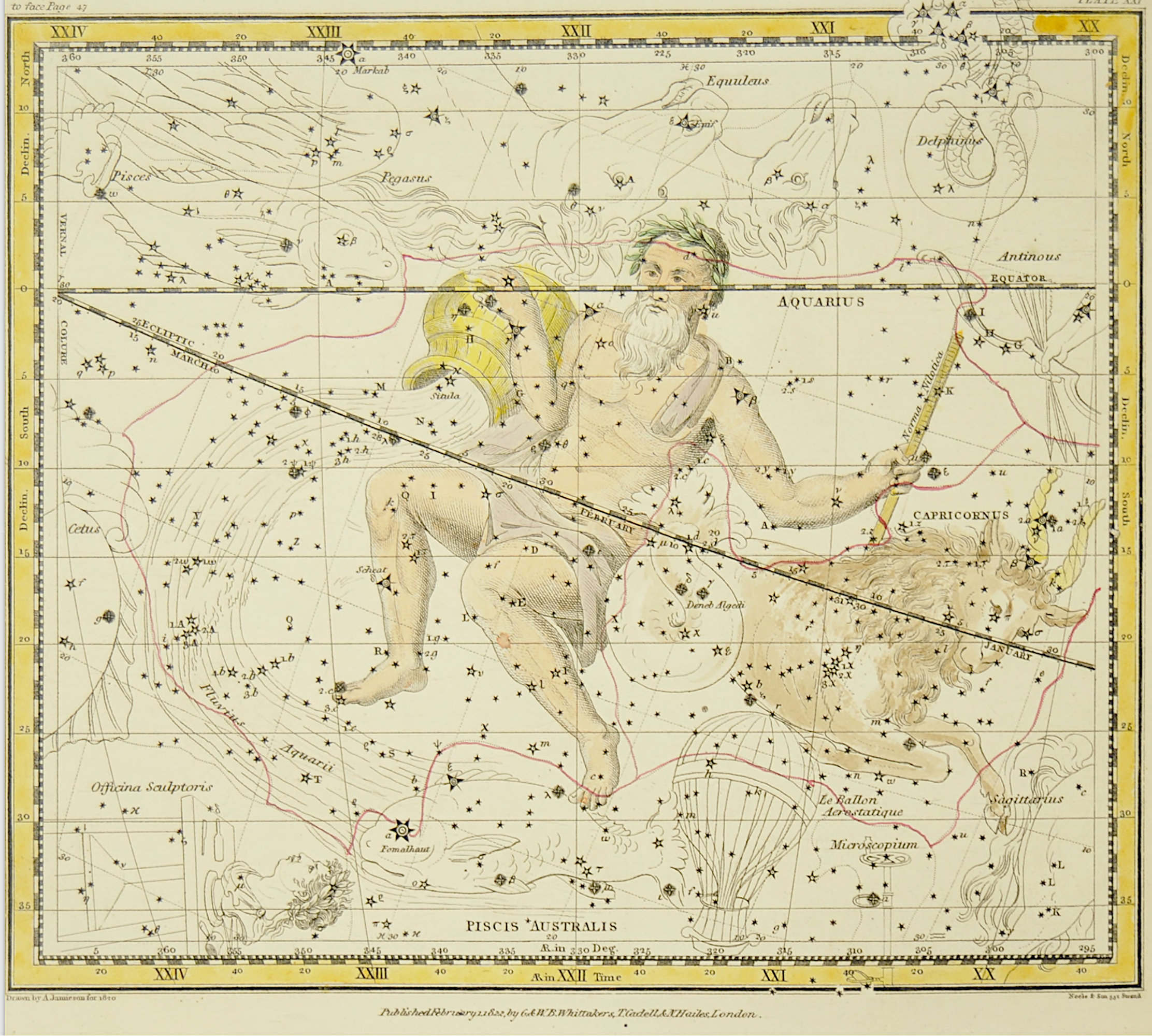
The constellation Aquarius and surrounding stars, from A celestial atlas : comprising a systematic display of the heavens in a series of thirty maps (plate 21)

Norma Nilotica (Genitive Normae Nilotica, Abbreviation NoN) is an obsolete constellation, or asterism, no longer in use by astronomers. Its name means "The Nile's Ruler" in Latin. It was created by Alexander Jamieson and first appeared in his book A Celestial Atlas, published in 1822. It subsequently appeared in Urania's Mirror (1824) and Elijah Hinsdale Burritt's 1835 book Atlas Designed to Illustrate the Geography of the Heavens. The constellation is depicted as a measuring rod (or nilometer) held in the left hand of the water carrier Aquarius. Depicting Aquarius with a nilometer references the ancient Egyptian association of Aquarius with the flooding of the Nile river.

Up until 1928, when the IAU set boundaries for the constellations which covered the entire celestial sphere, stars which were not included within a constellation listed by Ptolemy were sometimes used for creating new constellations. Norma Nilotica was essentially a line extending from 9 Aquarii (just north of Capricornus) northwest to 3 Aquarii. Today, all of its stars fall within the modern boundaries of Aquarius.

Norma Nilotica is mentioned in Henry Melville's 1874 book Veritas. Revelation of mysteries, biblical, historical and social, by means of the Median and Persian laws which contains a multipage prose description of the constellations including:

Then comes the left hand of Aquarius, or the Greek Neptune or Hebrew Moses. In his hand is the celebrated rod: it is the 24-inch gauge of the masons, and on it are marked or notched the twenty-four hours. The present name is Norma Nilotica.

Charles Augustus Young mentioned the constellation in very briefly in his 1903 book Lessons in Astronomy, Including Uranography wherein he wrote:

Norma Nilotica, the rule with which the height of the Nile was measured, lies west of Scorpio, while Ara lies due south of Eta and Theta. Both are old Ptolemaic constellations, but are small and of little importance, at least to observers in our latitudes.

Note that this passage contains two errors: Norma Nilotica is not west of Scorpio and is not a Ptolemaic constellation.

== See also ==
- Former constellations

== Gallery ==
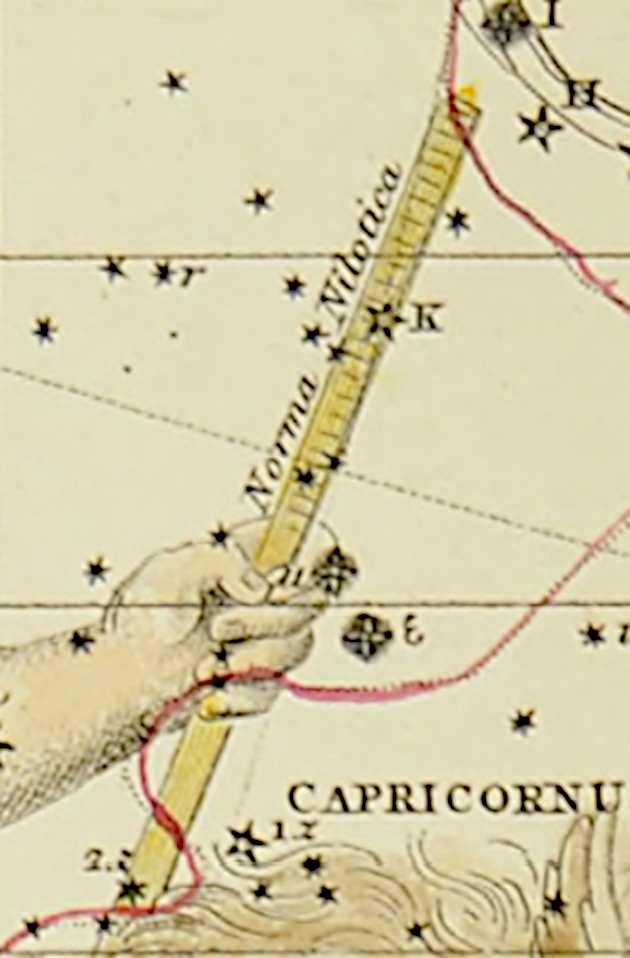
A detail from plate 21 of A Celestial Atlas, showing Norma Nilotica

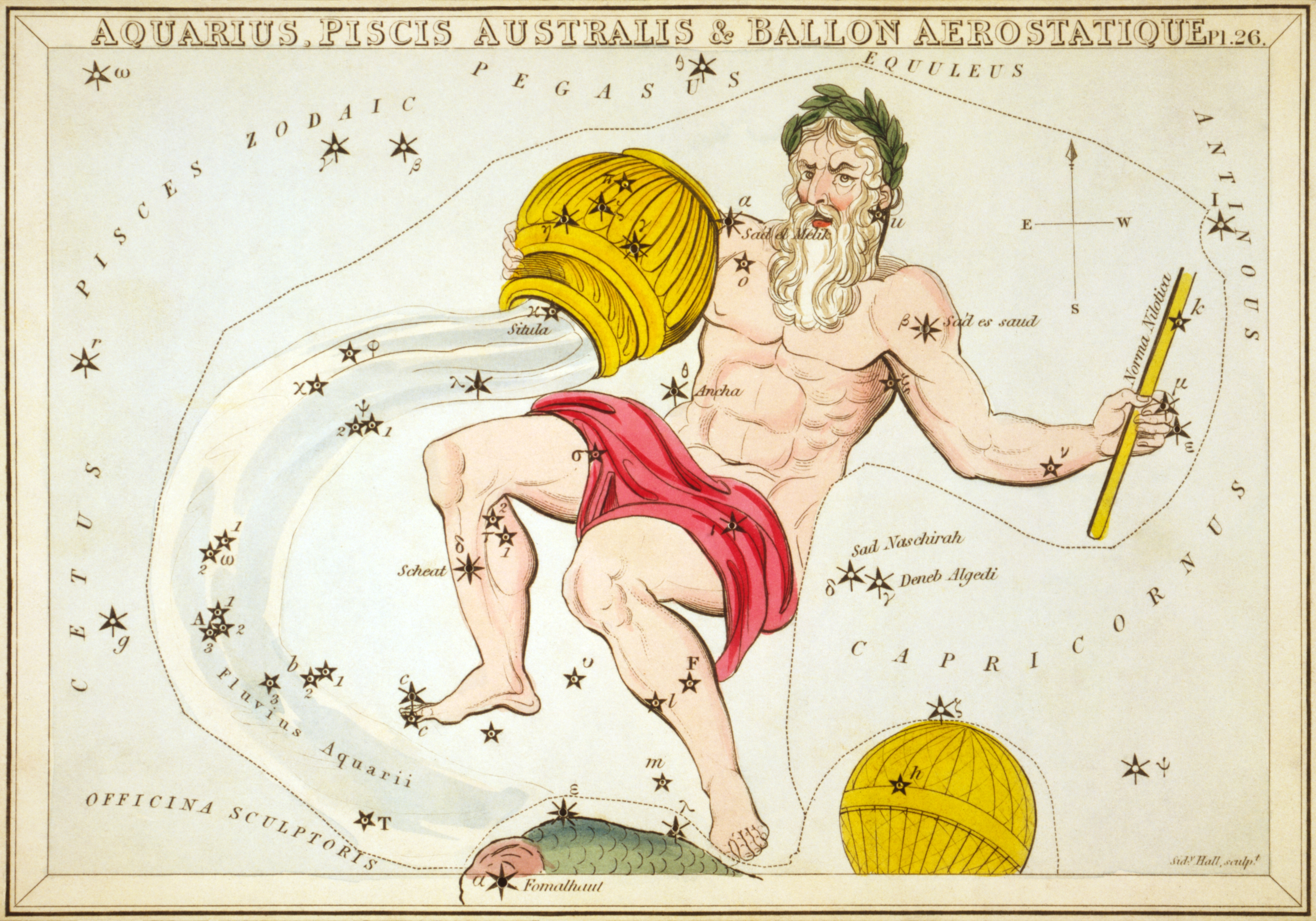
Norma Nilotica depicted on Plate 26 of Urania's Mirror

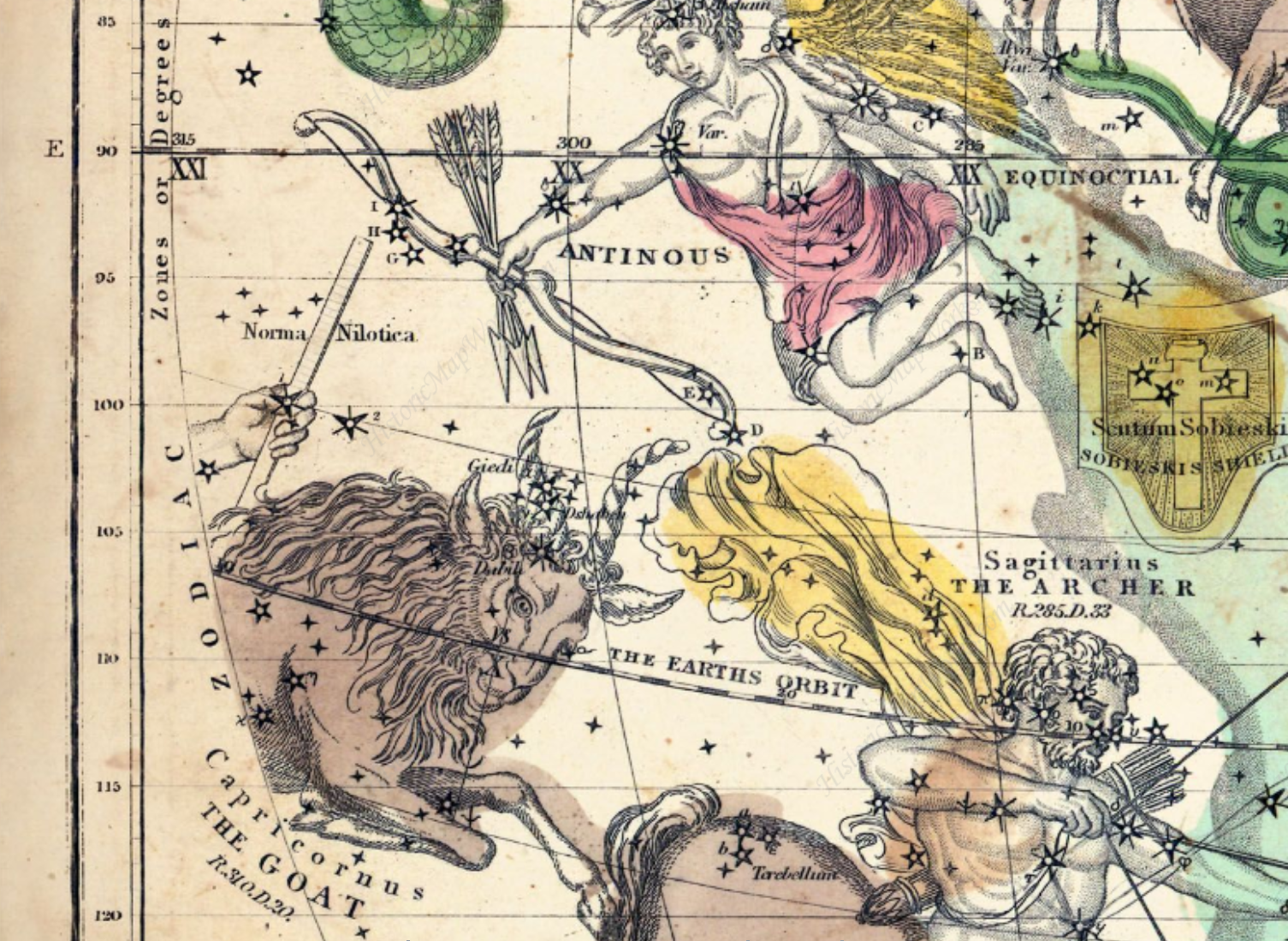
A detail from the July–September plate of Atlas Designed to Illustrate the Geography of the Heavens, showing Norma Nilotica near the left edge
