= Jordanus =

Jordanus is the Latin form of Jordan and may refer to:

- Jordanus of Bristol, a saint venerated in Bristol, England
- Jordan Catala (Friar Jordanus), a 14th-century French missionary and explorer
- Jordanus de Nemore (Renaissance version: Jordanus Nemorarius), a medieval mathematician
- Jordanus of Saxony, c. 1190–1237, 2nd Master General of the Order of Preachers (Dominicans)
- Raymundus Jordanus, a 14th-century Christian writer also known as Idiota

It may also refer to:

- Jordanus (constellation), an obsolete constellation name
- 25 Canum Venaticorum, a star named Jordanus after the constellation
