= Polophylax =

Former constellation

Polophylax (Greek: guardian of the pole) was a southern constellation that lay where Tucana and Grus now are.

During the Renaissance several new constellations were created for recorded stars that were outside the boundaries of the existing Ptolemaic constellations. Polophylax was introduced (along with the constellation Columba) by Petrus Plancius in the small celestial planispheres on his large wall map of 1592. It is also shown on his smaller world map of 1594 and on world maps copied from Plancius.

It was superseded by the twelve constellations which Petrus Plancius formed in late 1597 or early 1598 from the southern star observations of Pieter Dircksz Keyser and Frederik de Houtman.

== See also ==
- Former constellations
