= Noctua (constellation) =

Former constellation

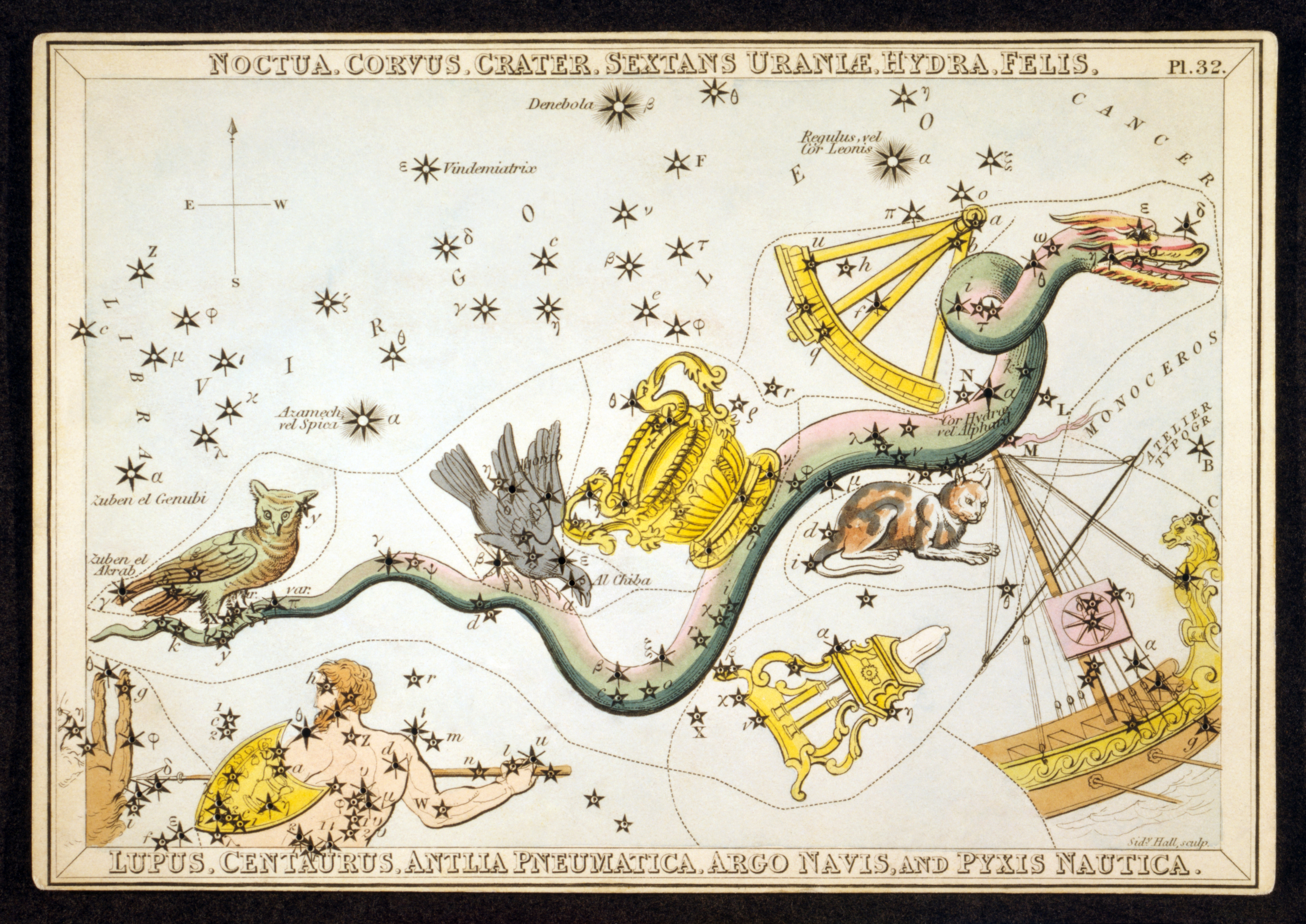
Card 32 of Urania's Mirror depicts Noctua the owl, perched on the tail of Hydra, the serpent.

Noctua (Latin: owl) was a constellation near the tail of Hydra in the southern celestial hemisphere, but is no longer recognized. It was introduced by Alexander Jamieson in his 1822 work, A Celestial Atlas, and appeared in a derived collection of illustrated cards, Urania's Mirror. Noctua also appeared in Elijah Burritt's very popular Atlas of the Heavens through most of the 19th century. The owl was composed of stars ranging from Brachium in southern Libra, along what is now the border of Libra and Hydra and into southern Virgo as far as 89 Virginis.

The French astronomer Pierre Charles Le Monnier had introduced a bird on Hydra's tail as the constellation Solitaire, named for the extinct flightless bird, the Rodrigues solitaire, but the image was that of a rock thrush which had been classified in the genus Turdus, giving rise to the constellation name Turdus Solitarius, the solitary thrush. It has also been depicted as a mockingbird.

== NGC 5694 ==
The globular star cluster NGC 5694 is located just below the tail of the former Noctua within the bounds of modern Hydra.

== See also ==
- Former constellations
