= Solarium (constellation) =

Former sundial-like arrangement of stars

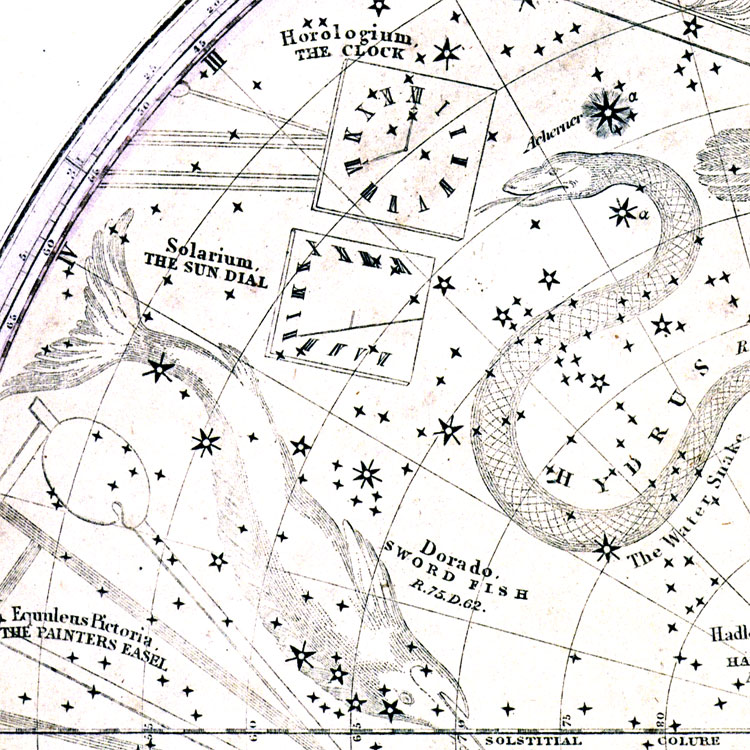
An image depicting the location of the now obsolete constellation of Solarium from an atlas published in 1838.

Solarium (Latin for sundial) was a constellation located between the constellations of Horologium, Dorado and Hydrus. It was introduced in 1822 on the Celestial Atlas of Alexander Jamieson, who substituted it for the constellation Reticulum invented by Nicolas Louis de Lacaille. A decade later, it was picked up by Elijah Hinsdale Burritt to whom it is sometimes attributed. It was never popular and is no longer in use.

== See also ==
- Former constellations
