= Isaac Habrecht II =

Isaac Habrecht II (1589–1633) was a professor of astronomy and mathematics in Strasbourg. He was also a doctor of medicine and philosophy.

== Uranography ==
Isaac Habrecht II made a celestial globe and a couple of celestial planispheres. He included constellations that were created by Dutch cartographer, Plancius, and he invented the now obsolete constellation Rhombus. Rhombus was included in several later charts, including those of Royer. Lacaille's southern star chart of 1756 reconfigured the constellation into le Reticule Romboide (now Reticulum).

== Family ==
- Isaac Habrecht I: his father, a horologist.
- Isaac Habrecht III: his nephew, a clockmaker.

== See also ==
- Uranography
