= Sceptrum et Manus Iustitiae =

Former constellation

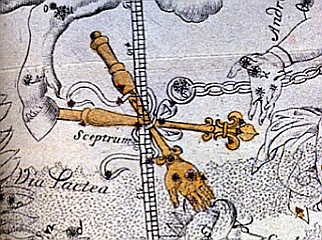
Sceptrum et Manus Iustitiae constellation

Sceptrum et Manus Iustitiae (Latin for scepter and hand of justice) was a constellation created by Augustin Royer in 1679 to honor king Louis XIV of France. It was formed from stars of what is today the constellations Lacerta and western Andromeda. Due to the awkward name the constellation was modified and name changed a couple of times, for example some old star maps show Sceptrum Imperiale, Stellio and Scettro, and Johannes Hevelius's star map divides the area between the new Lacerta and as a chain end fettering Andromeda. The connection with the later constellation Frederici Honores, that occupied the chain end of Andromeda, is unclear, except that both represent a regal spire attributed to varying regents.

== See also ==
- Former constellations
