= 66 Aquilae =

Star in the constellation Aquila

Observation data Epoch J2000 Equinox ICRS
- Constellation: Aquila
- Right ascension: 20^{h} 13^{m} 13.87230^{s}
- Declination: −01° 00′ 33.7724″
- Apparent magnitude (V): 5.44

Characteristics
- Spectral type: K5 III
- B−V color index: 1.430±0.001

Astrometry
Radial velocity (R_{v})	−30.1±1.7 km/s
Proper motion (μ)	RA: +32.872 mas/yr Dec.: –15.851 mas/yr
Parallax (π)	4.4436±0.3133 mas
Distance	730 ± 50 ly (230 ± 20 pc)
Absolute magnitude (M_{V})	−1.20

Details
Mass	1.4 M_{☉}
Radius	55 R_{☉}
Luminosity	753 L_{☉}
Surface gravity (log g)	1.27 cgs
Temperature	4,006 K
Metallicity [Fe/H]	−0.19 dex
Age	2.3 Gyr

Other designations
- 66 Aql, BD−01°3920, GC 28068, HD 192107, HIP 99631, HR 7720, SAO 144181

Database references
SIMBAD	data

66 Aquilae, abbreviated 66 Aql, is a fifth-magnitude star in the constellation of Aquila. 66 Aquilae is its Flamsteed designation. It is visible to the naked eye, having an apparent visual magnitude of 5.44. The star shows an annual parallax shift of 4.4 mas, which provides a distance estimate of around 730 light years. It is moving closer to the Earth with a heliocentric radial velocity of −30 km/s. The motion of the star over time suggests some displacement, which may indicate it is a close binary system.

This is an aging giant star with a stellar classification of K5 III, which indicates it has exhausted the supply of hydrogen at its core and expanded off the main sequence. The measured angular diameter of this star, after correcting for limb darkening, is 2.44±0.03 mas. At its estimated distance, this yields a physical size of roughly 55 times the radius of the Sun. It is radiating 753 times the Sun's luminosity from its enlarged photosphere at an effective temperature of 4,006 K, giving the star an orange hue. This star was part of the obsolete constellation Anguilla.
