= Officina Typographica =

Former constellation

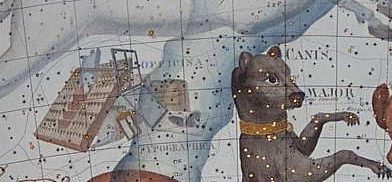
Bode's depiction of his short-lived constellation Officina Typographica.

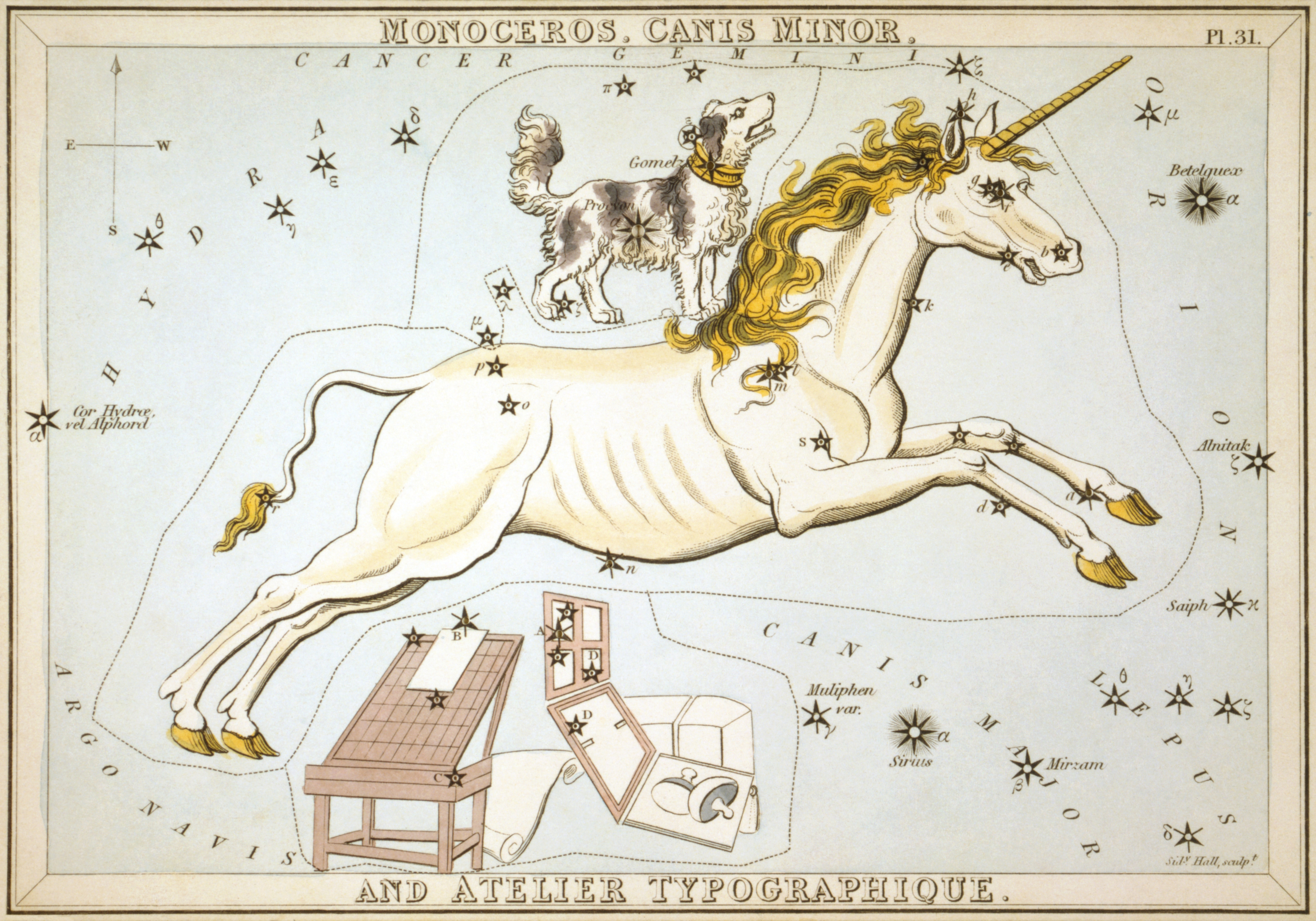
Seen as "Atelier Typographique" alongside Monoceros and Canis Minor in Urania's Mirror.

Officina Typographica (Latin for printing office) was a constellation located east of Sirius and Canis Major, north of Puppis, and south of Monoceros. It was drawn up by Johann Bode and Joseph Jérôme de Lalande in 1798, and included in the former's star atlas Uranographia in 1801, honouring the printing press of Johannes Gutenberg. Lalande reported wanting to honour French and German discoveries in the same manner that Nicolas-Louis de Lacaille had done for his new constellations. It was called Buchdrucker-Werkstatt by Bode initially, and later Atelier Typographique in the 1825 work Urania's Mirror, Atelier de l’Imprimeur by Preyssinger in 1862 and Antlia Typographiae in 1888.

The constellation appeared in later star atlases through the 19th century but was rarely used by the end of the century; Richard Hinckley Allen noted its most recent use had been in 1878 in Father Angelo Secchi's planisphere, but stated "it is seldom found in the maps of our day.". The stars were later absorbed into northern Puppis, and remained permanently there after the setting of the constellation boundaries in 1928.

== See also ==
- Former constellations
