= A Celestial Atlas =

Star atlas

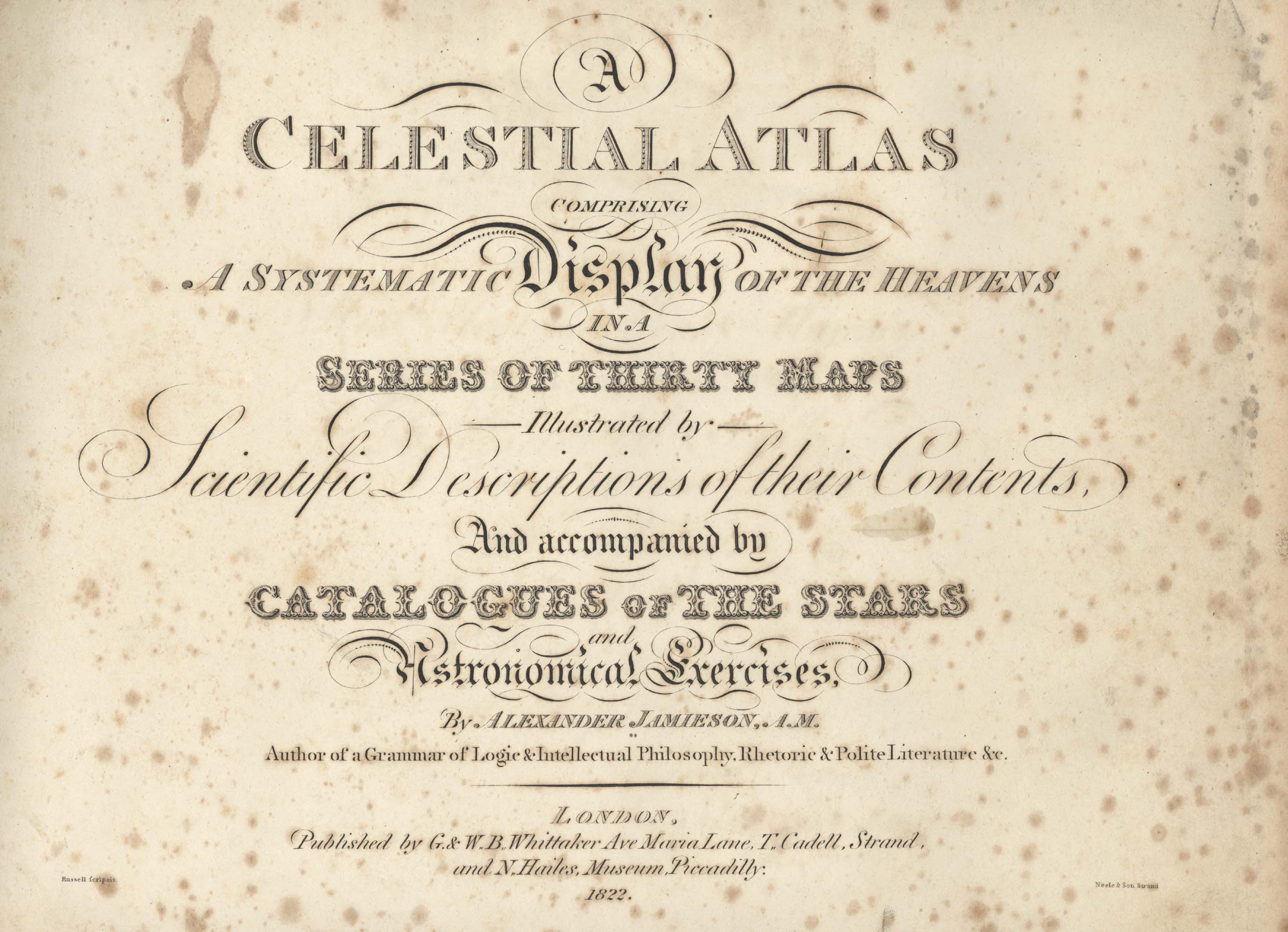
Title page.

A Celestial Atlas, full title: A Celestial Atlas: Comprising A Systematic Display of the Heavens in a Series of Thirty Maps Illustrated by Scientific Description of their Contents, And accompanied by Catalogues of the Stars and Astronomical Exercises is a star atlas by British author Alexander Jamieson, published in 1822. The atlas includes 30 plates, 26 of which are constellation maps with a sinusoidal projection. In some editions the plates are hand-colored. The atlas includes three new (but now-obsolete) constellations invented by Jamieson: Noctua, Norma Nilotica, and Solarium. Two celestial hemispheres of the atlas are centered on the equatorial poles via polar projection and geocentric alignment. The atlas comprises stars visible only to the naked eye, making it less cluttered.

Unlike Johann Elert Bode and Jean Nicolas Fortin, who followed John Flamsteed's depictions of the constellations, Jamieson allowed himself greater artistic expression. The constellation figures in Jamieson's atlas are more realistically drawn, particularly compared to Flamsteed's depictions of Lacerta, Lynx, Cancer, Scorpius and Canis Major. At the same time the atlas' plates were made at the size of those by Bode and Fortin, at approximately 9 in × 7 in (22.5 × 17.5 cm), with the same number of them (26 plus hemispheres) and each covering the same area of sky. Jamieson also followed Bode’s approach of drawing boundary lines between constellations. The atlas was popular and was allowed to be dedicated to King George IV.

The drawings in A Celestial Atlas were plagiarised in Urania's Mirror, published a few years later.
