= Antinous (constellation) =

Obsolete star formation

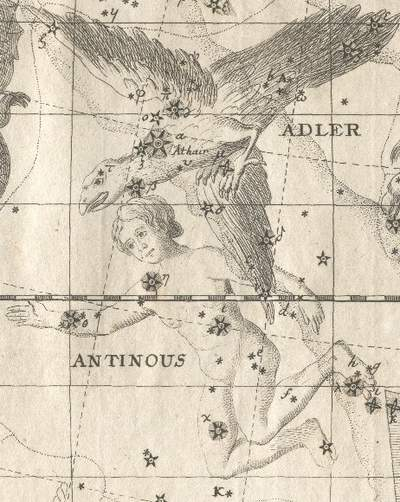
Constellations Antinous (below) and Aquila ("Adler" in German). From Johann Bode's Vorstellung der Gestirne (1782).

Antinous is an obsolete constellation no longer in use by astronomers, having been merged into Aquila, which it bordered to the north.

The constellation was created by the emperor Hadrian in 132. Antinous was a beautiful youth loved by Hadrian, and also his erotic lover. Cassius Dio, having access to Hadrian's diary now lost, informs that Antinous died either by drowning or (as he himself believed) as a voluntary human sacrifice, something supported by Lambert (1984). The elevation to divinity meant that Antinous was to be a god in the heavens forever – Hadrian having named an asterism in the sky after him.

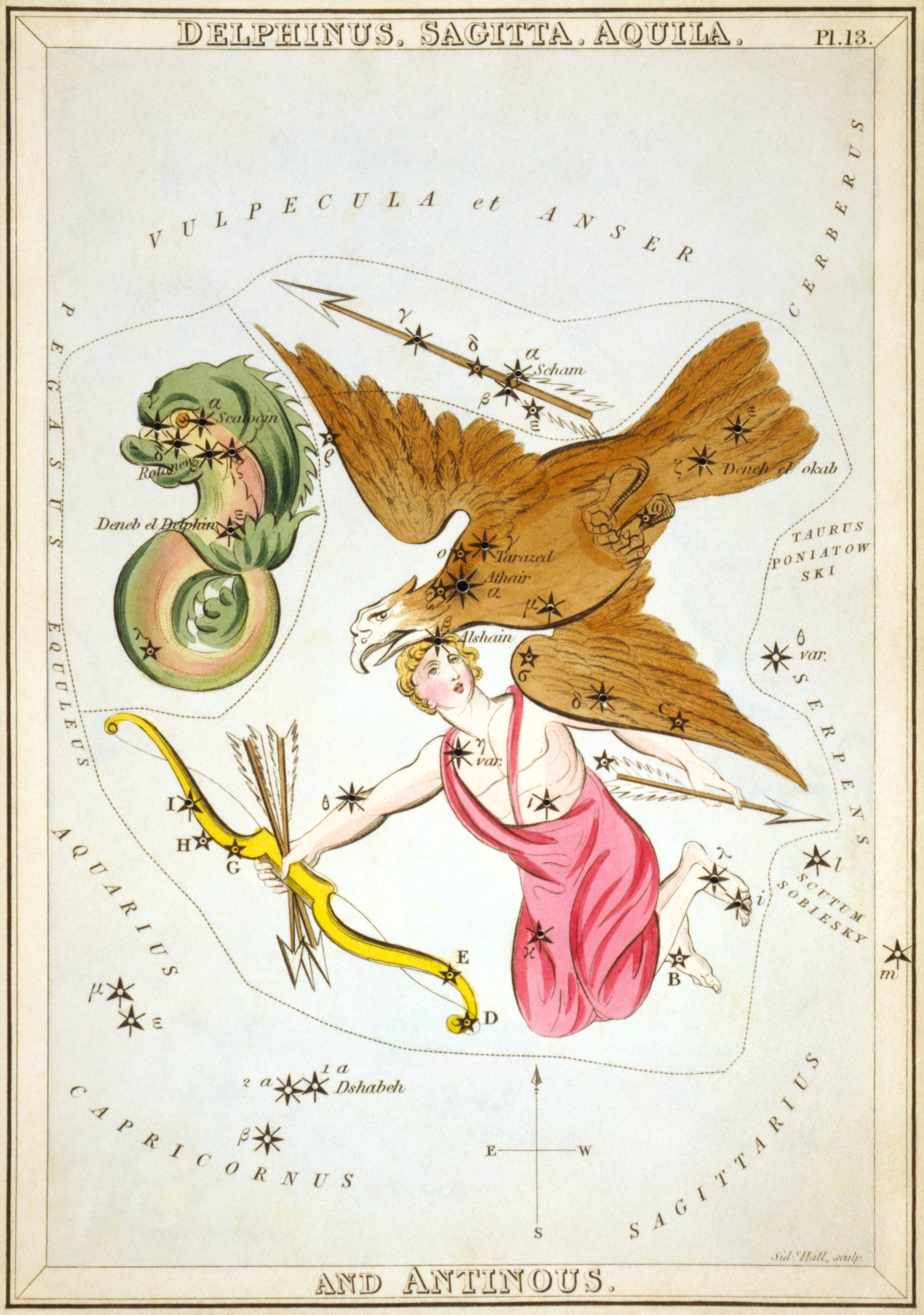
Seen in Urania's Mirror (1825)

Tycho Brahe was originally given credit for inventing Antinous, but current finds include a celestial globe by the cartographer Caspar Vopel from 1536 that contains Antinous, so Brahe simply measured up the sky according to contemporary traditions and decided to give Antinous a separate table in his star catalogue.

In the following modern times, Antinous has been variously considered an asterism within Aquila or as a separate constellation, until the International Astronomical Union discarded it when formalizing the 88 constellations in 1922.

The IAU Working Group on Star Names approved the name Antinous for the primary star of the Binary Star system Theta Aquilae A in 2024, after the obsolete constellation.

== See also ==
- Former constellations
