= Lochium Funis =

Former constellation

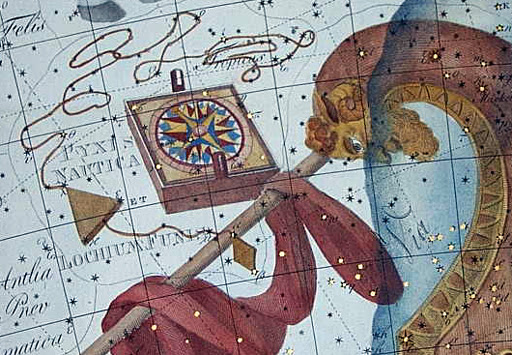

Lochium Funis (Latin for the log and line) was a constellation created by Johann Bode in 1801 next to the constellation Pyxis, an earlier invention of Nicolas Louis de Lacaille. It represented the log and line used by seamen for measuring a ship's speed through the water. It was never used by other astronomers.

== See also ==
- Former constellations
