= Leo Palatinus =

Obsolete constellation

Leo Palatinus (Latin for Palatine Lion) was a constellation created by the astronomer Karl-Joseph König in 1785. He created the constellation to honor the patrons, Count Palatine Charles Theodore and Countess Palatine Elizabeth Auguste, of the observatory in Mannheim, Germany, where he worked. However, the constellation failed to attract attention from contemporary and subsequent astronomers, and it was never depicted in a chart aside from the 1785 description.

Leo Palatinus was made of two non-contiguous groups of stars: a scattering of fourth-magnitude stars in far northwestern Aquarius made a crowned lion, and second part of even fainter stars west of Equuleus made a monogram CTEA (the combined initials of König's patrons) above the lion.

== See also ==
- Former constellations
