= 25 Canum Venaticorum =

Star in the constellation Canes Venatici

- Location of 25 Canum Venaticorum (circled in red)

Observation data Epoch J2000 Equinox ICRS
- Constellation: Canes Venatici
- Right ascension: 13^{h} 37^{m} 27.62782^{s}
- Declination: +36° 17′ 41.6337″
- Apparent magnitude (V): +4.82 (4.98 + 6.95)

Characteristics
- Spectral type: A7 III + A8 V:

Astrometry
| Radial velocity (R_{v}) | −10.4±2.1 km/s |
| Proper motion (μ) | RA: −95.54 mas/yr Dec.: +23.75 mas/yr |
| Parallax (π) | 16.42±0.53 mas |
| Distance | 199 ± 6 ly (61 ± 2 pc) |
| Absolute magnitude (M_{V}) | 0.90 |

Orbit
| Period (P) | 228 yr |
| Semi-major axis (a) | 1.02″ |
| Eccentricity (e) | 0.80 |
| Inclination (i) | 147° |
| Longitude of the node (Ω) | 87° |
| Periastron epoch (T) | 1864.0 |
| Argument of periastron (ω) (secondary) | 159° |

Details

25 CVn A
| Mass | 2.23 M_{☉} |
| Surface gravity (log g) | 3.85 cgs |
| Temperature | 7,609±259 K |
| Rotational velocity (v sin i) | 235 km/s |
| Age | 659 Myr |

25 CVn B
| Mass | 1.58 M_{☉} |

Other designations
- Jordanus, 25 CVn, BD+37°2433, FK5 3083, GC 18421, HD 118623, HIP 66458, HR 5127, SAO 63648, ADS 8974, CCDM 13375+3617, WDS J13375+3618

Database references
| SIMBAD | data |

25 Canum Venaticorum, also named Jordanus, is a binary star system in the northern constellation of Canes Venatici, approximately 199 light years from the Sun. It is visible to the naked eye as a faint, white-hued star with a combined apparent visual magnitude of +4.82 The system is moving closer to the Earth with a heliocentric radial velocity of roughly −10 km/s.

This is a wide binary system with an orbital period of 228 years and an eccentricity of 0.80. As of 2001, they had a projected separation of 107.0 AU. The magnitude 4.98 primary, component A, has a stellar classification of A7 III, which matches an A-type giant star. It is 659 million years old with a projected rotational velocity of 235 km/s. This rate of spin is giving the star an oblate shape with an equatorial bulge that is an estimated 27% larger than the polar radius. The companion, component B, is a magnitude 6.95 A-type main-sequence star with a class of A8 V:. The ':' suffix indicates some uncertainty in the classification of this star.

This star was part of Jordanus, a former constellation representing the Jordan River. The IAU Working Group on Star Names approved the name Jordanus for 25 Canum Venaticorum A on 17 September 2026.
