= HD 81799 =

Star and suspected binary system in the constellation Hydra

- Location of HD 81799 (circled in red)

Observation data Epoch J2000 Equinox ICRS
- Constellation: Hydra
- Right ascension: 09^{h} 27^{m} 18.43258^{s}
- Declination: −22° 20′ 37.4967″
- Apparent magnitude (V): 4.69

Characteristics
- Evolutionary stage: red clump
- Spectral type: K2+ IIIb
- B−V color index: 1.154

Astrometry
Radial velocity (R_{v})	29.05±0.28 km/s
Proper motion (μ)	RA: +160.160 mas/yr Dec.: −173.131 mas/yr
Parallax (π)	19.8887±0.3128 mas
Distance	164 ± 3 ly (50.3 ± 0.8 pc)
Absolute magnitude (M_{V})	1.32

Details
Radius	10.6 R_{☉}
Luminosity	41.97 L_{☉}
Surface gravity (log g)	2.43 cgs
Temperature	4,490 K
Metallicity [Fe/H]	−0.01 dex

Other designations
- G Hya, BD−21°2802, HD 81799, HIP 46371, HR 3749, SAO 177469, LTT 3479

Database references
SIMBAD	data

HD 81799 (G Hydrae) is a suspected astrometric binary star system in the equatorial constellation of Hydra. It is visible to the naked eye with an apparent visual magnitude of 4.69. The distance to this system, as determined from an annual parallax shift of 19.9 mas, is 164 light years. It is moving further away from the Earth with a heliocentric radial velocity of 29 km/s. The system has a relatively high rate of proper motion, traversing the celestial sphere at the rate of 233±19 mas/yr along a position angle of 136°.

The stellar classification of the visible component is K2+ IIIb, which matches an evolved K-type giant star. It is a red clump star, which indicates it is on the horizontal branch and is generating energy through helium fusion at its core. The interferometry-measured angular diameter of the primary, after correcting for limb darkening, is 1.96±0.03 mas, which, at its estimated distance, equates to a physical radius of about 10.6 times the radius of the Sun. It is radiating 42 times the Sun's luminosity from its enlarged photosphere at an effective temperature of 4,490 K.

The system is a likely (99.4% chance) source of the X-ray emission coming from these coordinates.
