= Augustin Royer =

Augustin Royer was a French architect who lived in the time of Louis XIV.

In 1679 he published a star map; in addition to the 48 constellations of Ptolemy, and the additions of more recent astronomers and cartographers such as Plancius, he added two constellations of his own, in honour of his patron, Louis XIV; Lilium (the Lily, representing the emblem of France) and Sceptrum et Manus Iustitiae (the Sceptre and the Hand of Justice, depicting the regal symbols).

Neither of these constellations has survived in the modern IAU system.

Royer is often named as the creator of the constellation Columba (the Dove) by splitting off part of the constellation Canis Major, and the constellation Crux (the Southern Cross) with stars from Centaurus but these were in fact already formed (and depicted) in 1589 and in 1592 by Petrus Plancius.
