= Musca Borealis =

Former constellation

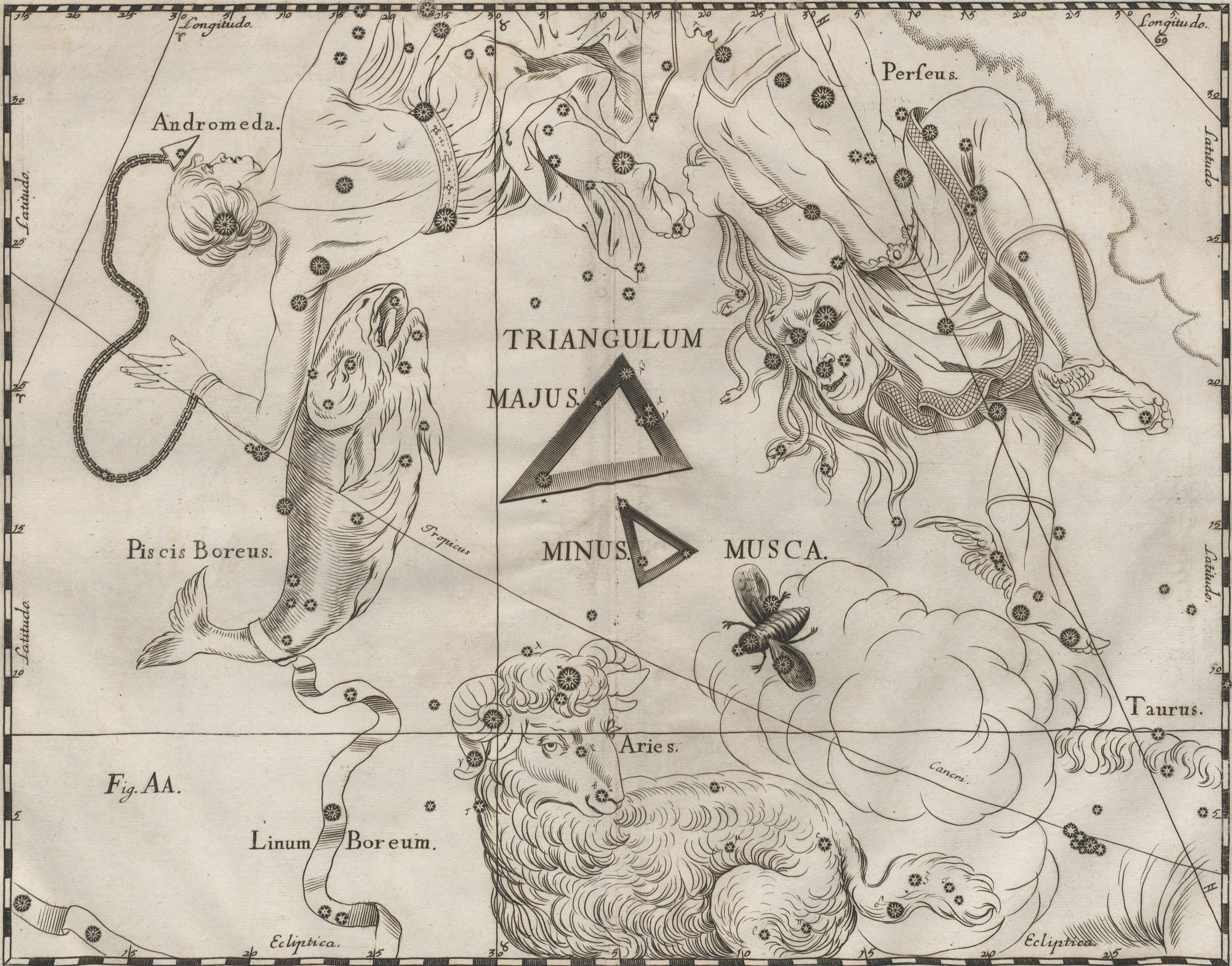
Constellation Musca in Johannes Hevelius' atlas (1690). In this atlas, constellations are shown as they would appear on a globe, i.e. back to front by comparison with their appearance in the sky.

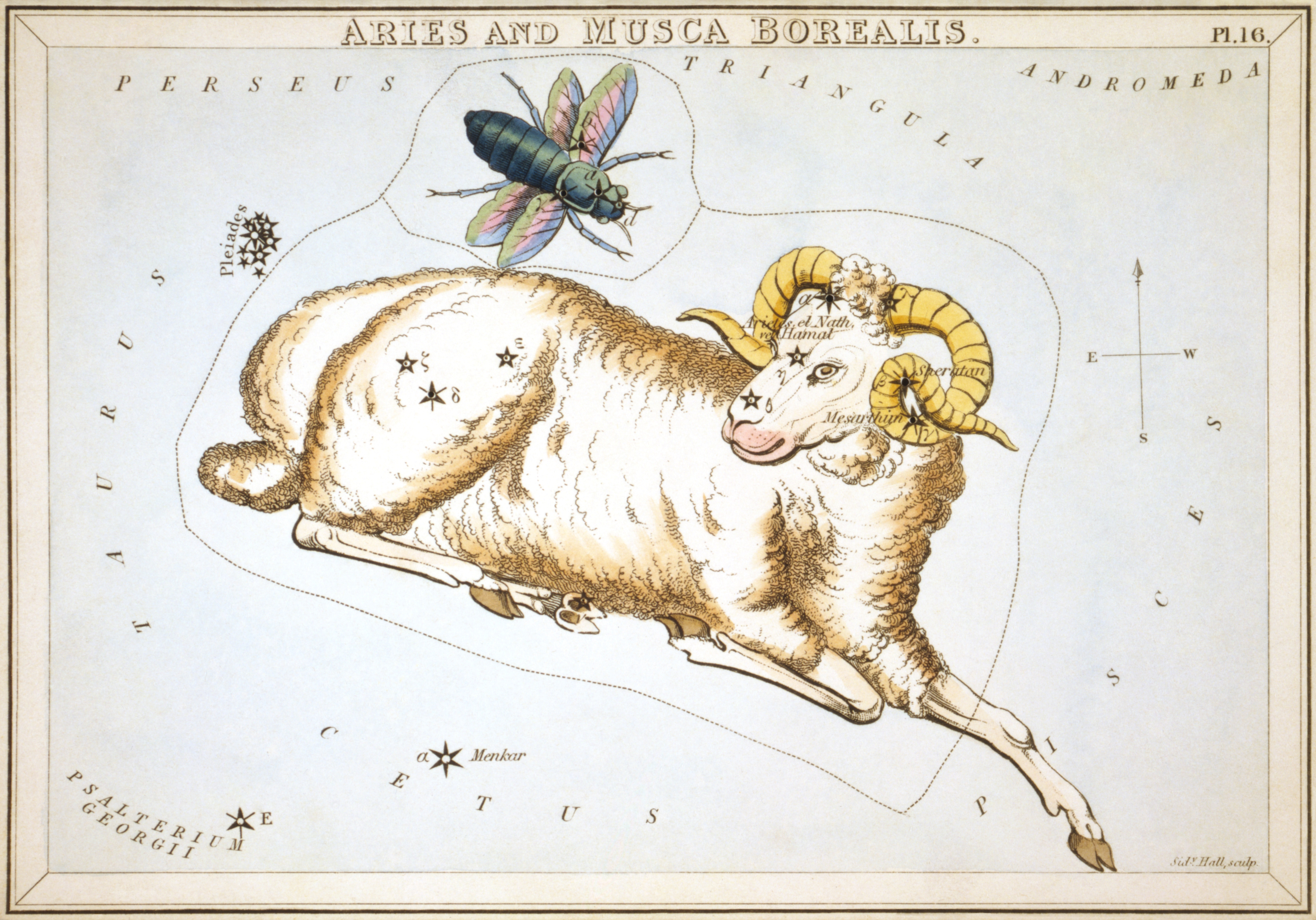
In Urania's Mirror (1825).

Musca Borealis (Latin for northern fly) was a constellation, now discarded, located between the constellations of Aries and Perseus. It was originally called Apes (plural of Apis, Latin for bee) by Petrus Plancius when he created it in 1612. It was made up of a small group of stars, now called 33 Arietis, 35 Arietis, 39 Arietis, and 41 Arietis, in the north of the constellation of Aries.

The brightest star is now known as 41 Arietis (Bharani). At magnitude 3.63, it is a blue-white main sequence star of spectral type B8V around 166 light-years distant. 39 Arietis (Lilii Borea) is an orange giant star of magnitude 4.51 and spectral type K1.5III that is around 171 light-years distant.

The constellation was renamed Vespa by Jakob Bartsch in 1624. The renaming by Bartsch may have been intended to avoid confusion with another constellation, created by Plancius in 1598, that was called Apis by Bayer in 1603. Plancius called this earlier constellation Muia (Greek for fly) in 1612, and it had been called Musca (Latin for fly) by Blaeu in 1602, although Bayer was evidently unaware of this.

In 1679 Augustin Royer used these stars for his constellation Lilium (the Lily, representing the fleur-de-lis and in honour of his patron, King Louis XIV).

It was first described as "Musca" by Hevelius in his catalogue of 1690. Subsequent astronomers renamed it into "Musca Borealis", to distinguish it from the southern fly, Musca Australis.

This constellation is no longer in use; the stars it contained are now included in Aries. The Southern Fly, Musca Australis, is now simply known as Musca.

== See also ==
- Apis
- Musca
- Former constellations
- Bharani
