= River Tigris (constellation) =

Former constellation

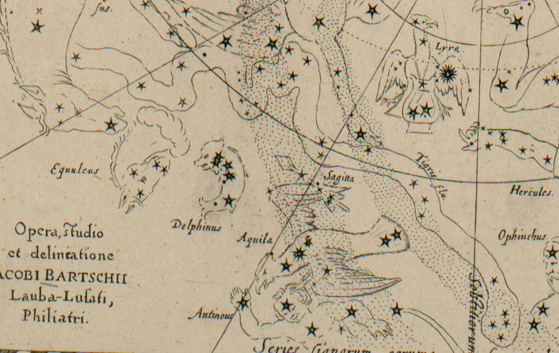
A depiction of the River Tigris constellation

River Tigris or Tigris (named after the Tigris river) was a constellation, introduced in 1612 by Petrus Plancius. One end was near the shoulder of Ophiuchus and the other was near Pegasus, and in between it passed through the area now occupied by Vulpecula, flowing between Cygnus and Aquila. It did not appear on Hevelius' atlas of 1687 or Johann Bode's Uranographia atlas of 1801 and was quickly forgotten.

== See also ==
- Former constellations
