= 41 Arietis =

Binary star in the constellation Aries

- Location of 41 Arietis (circled)

Observation data Epoch J2000 Equinox ICRS
- Constellation: Aries
- Right ascension: 02^{h} 49^{m} 59.03324^{s}
- Declination: +27° 15′ 37.8260″
- Apparent magnitude (V): 3.63

Characteristics
- Evolutionary stage: main sequence
- Spectral type: B8 Vn
- U−B color index: −0.38
- B−V color index: −0.10

Astrometry
Radial velocity (R_{v})	+4 km/s
Proper motion (μ)	RA: +66.81 mas/yr Dec.: −116.52 mas/yr
Parallax (π)	19.69±0.19 mas
Distance	166 ± 2 ly (50.8 ± 0.5 pc)
Absolute magnitude (M_{V})	+0.08

Details
Mass	3.1±0.1 M_{☉}
Radius	2.5 R_{☉}
Luminosity	160 L_{☉}
Surface gravity (log g)	4.15 cgs
Temperature	11900 K
Rotational velocity (v sin i)	175 km/s
Age	130+10 −30 Myr

Other designations
- Bharani, c Arietis, ADS 2159, BD+26 471, FK5 100, HD 17573, HIP 13209, HR 838, SAO 75596, WDS 02500+2716

Database references
SIMBAD	data

41 Arietis (abbreviated 41 Ari) is a triple star system in the northern constellation of Aries. With an apparent visual magnitude of 3.63, this system is readily visible to the naked eye. It has an annual parallax shift of 19.69 mas, which indicates it is at a distance of 166 light-years (51 parsecs) from the Sun.

The system consists of a binary pair, designated 41 Arietis A, together with a third companion star, 41 Arietis D. (41 Arietis B and C form optical pairs with A, but are not physically related.) The components of A are themselves designated 41 Arietis Aa (formally named Bharani /ˈbærəni/) and Ab.

== Nomenclature ==
41 Arietis is the system's Flamsteed designation. Bayer did not assign a designation to this star, but Bode introduced the designation c Arietis. Bode considered the star part of the asterism Musca Borealis within Aries – he called the entire constellation Aries et Musca. The designations of the two constituents as 41 Arietis A and D, and those of A's components - 41 Arietis Aa and Ab - derive from the convention used by the Washington Multiplicity Catalog (WMC) for multiple star systems, and adopted by the International Astronomical Union (IAU).

Nicolas-Louis de Lacaille called the star Līliī Austrīnā (/ɔːˈstraɪnə/) 'southern of Lilium' (in Latin) in 1757, as a star of the now-defunct constellation of Lilium (the Lily). To him 39 Arietis was Līliī Boreā, 'northern of Lilium'.

In Hindu astronomy, Bharani (भरणी bharaṇī, Sanskrit pronunciation: [ˈbʱɐɽɐɳiː]) is the second nakshatra, or lunar mansion corresponding to 35, 39 and 41 Arietis. In 2016, the IAU organized a Working Group on Star Names (WGSN) to catalog and standardize proper names for stars. The WGSN decided to attribute proper names to individual stars rather than entire multiple systems. It approved the name Bharani for the component 41 Arietis Aa on 30 June 2017 and it is now so included in the List of IAU-approved Star Names.

In Chinese, 胃宿 (Wèi Su), meaning Stomach (asterism), refers to an asterism consisting of 41, 35 and 39 Arietis. Consequently, the Chinese name for 41 Arietis itself is 胃宿三 (Wèi Su sān, English: the Third Star of Stomach.)

In Avestan, the star was known as Upa-paoiri, and it was associated with one of the yazatas.

== Properties ==
The primary component is a B-type main sequence star with a stellar classification of B8 Vn. The suffix 'n' indicates 'nebulous' absorption lines in the star's spectrum caused by the Doppler effect of rapid rotation. It has a projected rotational velocity of 175 km/s. This is creating an equatorial bulge that is 12% larger than the star's polar radius. It is a candidate member of the AB Doradus moving group and has an orbiting companion at an angular separation of 0.3 arcseconds.
