= Gallus (constellation) =

Former constellation

Gallus (the cockerel) was a constellation introduced in 1612 (or 1613) by Petrus Plancius.

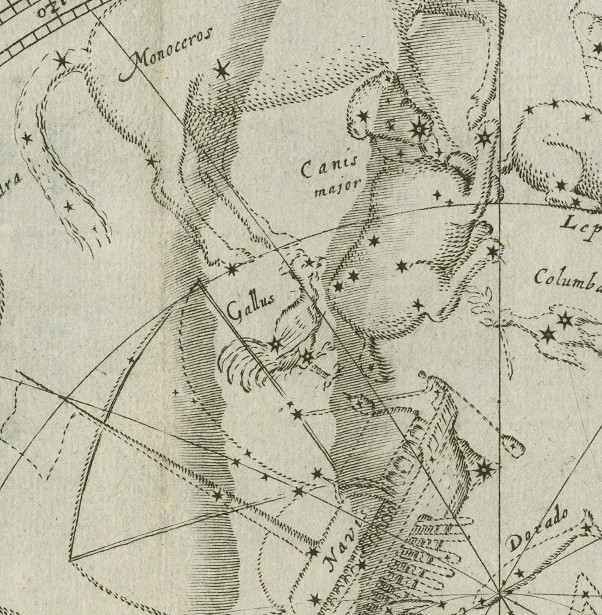

It was in the northern part of what is now Puppis. It was not adopted in the atlases of Johannes Hevelius, John Flamsteed and Johann Bode and fell into disuse. However, the nebula IC 2944, in the constellation Centaurus, is nicknamed the "Running Chicken" nebula.

== See also ==
- Former constellations
