= HD 83953 =

Star in the constellation Hydra

- Location of HD 83953 (circled in red)

Observation data Epoch J2000 Equinox ICRS
- Constellation: Hydra
- Right ascension: 09^{h} 41^{m} 17.00785^{s}
- Declination: −23° 35′ 29.4325″
- Apparent magnitude (V): 4.76

Characteristics
- Evolutionary stage: main sequence
- Spectral type: B5 V
- B−V color index: −0.117±0.015

Astrometry
Radial velocity (R_{v})	+16.05±1.5 km/s
Proper motion (μ)	RA: −29.969 mas/yr Dec.: +1.914 mas/yr
Parallax (π)	6.5733±0.2851 mas
Distance	500 ± 20 ly (152 ± 7 pc)
Absolute magnitude (M_{V})	−1.19

Details
Mass	4.57±0.08 M_{☉}
Radius	4.00±0.08 R_{☉}
Luminosity	708+60 −55 L_{☉}
Surface gravity (log g)	2.54±0.03 cgs
Temperature	15,000±150 K
Rotational velocity (v sin i)	315 km/s

Other designations
- I Hya, BD−22°2684, HD 83953, HIP 47522, HR 3858, SAO 177840

Database references
SIMBAD	data

HD 83953 (I Hydrae) is a single, blue-white hued star in the equatorial constellation of Hydra. It is visible to the naked eye, having an apparent visual magnitude of 4.76. Based upon an annual parallax shift of 6.6 mas, the distance to this star is estimated as 500 light years. It is moving further from Earth with a heliocentric radial velocity of +16 km/s.

This is a B-type main-sequence star with a stellar classification of B5 V. It has been known to be a Be star since 1926, when an Hβ emission line was discovered in the stellar spectrum by Mount Wilson Observatory. This energy is coming from a circumstellar envelope of heated gas that has been expelled from the central star and formed a thin orbiting disk. HD 83953 is spinning rapidly with a projected rotational velocity of 315 km/s, giving the star an oblate shape with an equatorial bulge that is 18% larger than the polar radius.

HD 83953 has 4.6 times the mass of the Sun and 4.0 times the Sun's radius. It is radiating 708 times the Sun's luminosity from its photosphere at an effective temperature of 15,000 K.
