= Jordanus (constellation) =

Former constellation

Jordanus (the Jordan River) was a constellation introduced in 1612 (or 1613) on a globe by Petrus Plancius and first shown in print by ‍‍Jakob Bartsch ‍in ‍his ‍book ‍‍Usus ‍Astronomicus ‍Planisphaerii ‍Stellati ‍(1624).

One end lay in the present-day Canes Venatici and then it flowed through the areas now occupied by Leo Minor and Lynx, ending near Camelopardalis. This constellation was not adopted in the atlases of Johann Bode and fell into disuse.

In 2026 the IAU gave the name Jordanus to the primary component 25 Canum Venaticorum A in commemoration of the obsolete constellation.

== See also ==
- Former constellations

== See also ==
- Obsolete constellations
- Coelum Stellatum Christianum (Julius Schiller, 1627) Christianized the constellation Hydra as the Jordan river.
