= 33 Arietis =

Binary star system in the constellation Aries

- Location of 33 Arietis (circled in red)

Observation data Epoch J2000 Equinox J2000
- Constellation: Aries
- Right ascension: 02^{h} 40^{m} 41.07563^{s}
- Declination: +27° 03′ 39.4040″
- Apparent magnitude (V): +5.33

Characteristics
- Spectral type: A3 V
- U−B color index: +0.13
- B−V color index: +0.09

Astrometry
Radial velocity (R_{v})	+21.0 km/s
Proper motion (μ)	RA: +64.83 mas/yr Dec.: -26.05 mas/yr
Parallax (π)	14.09±0.32 mas
Distance	231 ± 5 ly (71 ± 2 pc)

Details
Rotational velocity (v sin i)	107 km/s

Other designations
- BD+26°443, HD 16628, HIP 12489, HR 782, SAO 75510.

Database references
SIMBAD	data

33 Arietis (abbreviated 33 Ari) is a binary star in the northern constellation of Aries. 33 Arietis is the Flamsteed designation. The combined apparent magnitude of 5.33 is bright enough to be seen with the naked eye. Based upon an annual parallax shift of 14.09 mas, the distance to this system is approximately 231 light-years (71 parsecs).

The primary component is an A-type main sequence star with a magnitude of 5.40 and a stellar classification of A3 V. It has a magnitude 8.40 companion at an angular separation of 28.6 arcseconds. An excess of infrared emission suggests the presence of circumstellar dust in this system. In the 24μm band, this debris disk has a mean temperature of 815 K, which puts it at a radius of 0.85 astronomical units (AU) from the primary star. Excess emission appears in the 70μm band, which has a temperature of 103 K and a radius out to 42 AU.

This star was formerly located in the obsolete constellation Musca Borealis, also known as Lilium.
