= 39 Arietis =

Star in the constellation Aries

- Location of 39 Arietis (circled in red)

Observation data Epoch J2000 Equinox ICRS
- Constellation: Aries
- Right ascension: 02^{h} 47^{m} 54.54142^{s}
- Declination: +29° 14′ 49.6132″
- Apparent magnitude (V): 4.514

Characteristics
- Evolutionary stage: red clump
- Spectral type: K1.5 III
- U−B color index: +1.083
- B−V color index: +1.118
- R−I color index: 0.58

Astrometry
Radial velocity (R_{v})	−15.53±0.14 km/s
Proper motion (μ)	RA: +149.47±0.25 mas/yr Dec.: −127.05±0.18 mas/yr
Parallax (π)	19.01±0.21 mas
Distance	172 ± 2 ly (52.6 ± 0.6 pc)

Details
Mass	1.6 M_{☉}
Radius	10.22±0.72 R_{☉}
Luminosity	48.7±0.7 L_{☉}
Surface gravity (log g)	2.7 cgs
Temperature	4,768±167 K
Metallicity [Fe/H]	−0.02 dex
Rotational velocity (v sin i)	4.5 km/s

Other designations
- Lilii Borea, BD+28°462, HD 17361, HIP 13061, HR 824, SAO 75578.

Database references
SIMBAD	data

39 Arietis, officially named Lilii Borea /ˈlɪliaɪ ˈbɔːriə/, is a star in the northern constellation of Aries. It is visible to the naked eye with an apparent visual magnitude of +4.5. The distance to this star, as determined from an annual parallax shift of 19.01 mas, is approximately 172 light-years (53 parsecs). This star was formerly located in the obsolete constellation Musca Borealis.

== Nomenclature ==
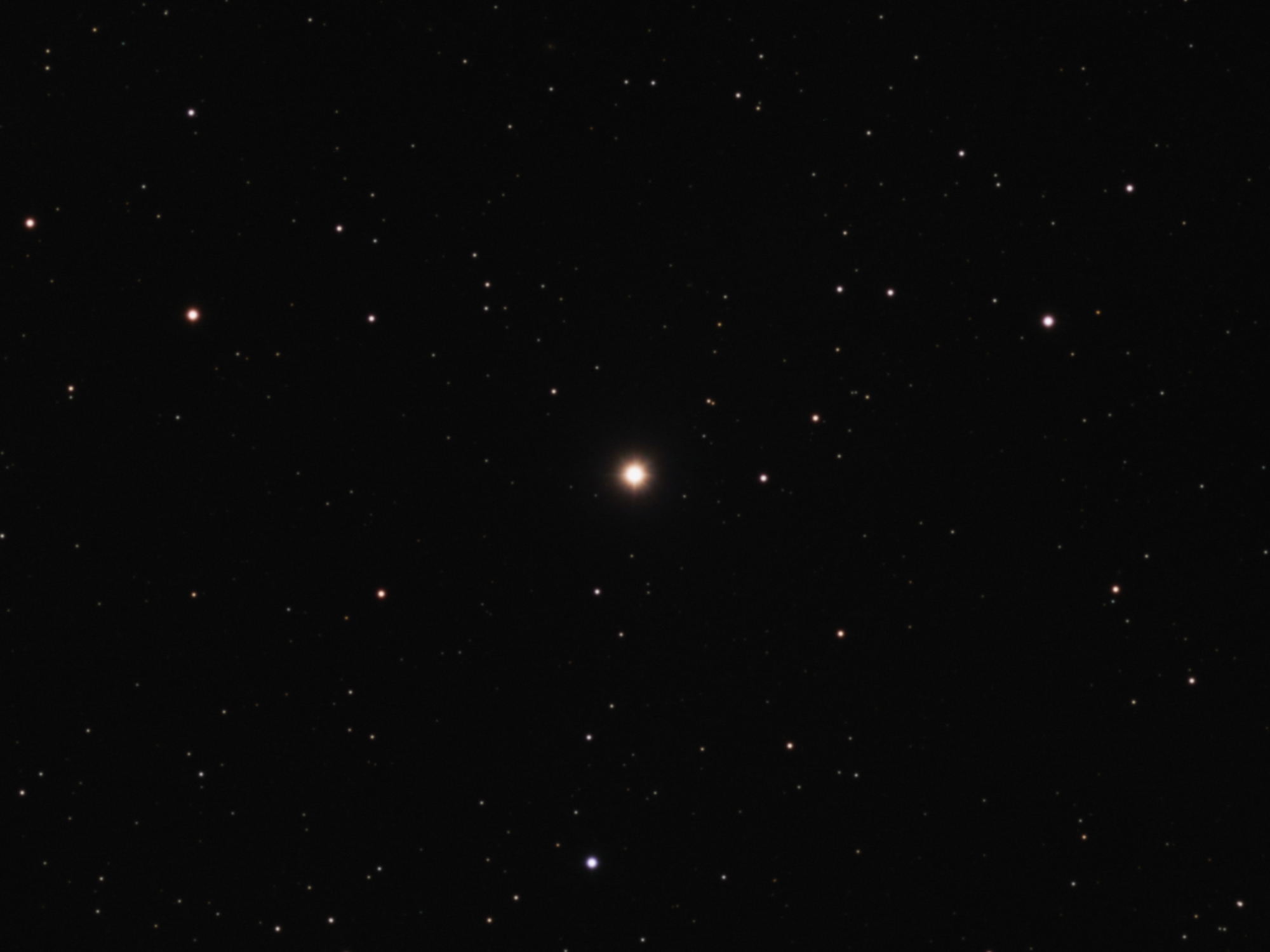
39 Arietis in optical light

39 Arietis (abbreviated 39 Ari) is the star's Flamsteed designation.

This star was described as Lilii Borea by Nicolas-Louis de Lacaille in 1757, as a star of the now-defunct constellation of Lilium (the Lily). The words are simply the Latin phrase Līliī Boreā 'in the north of Lilium'. Līliī Austrīnā /ɔːˈstraɪnə/ 'in the south of Lilium' was 41 Arietis.

In 2016, the International Astronomical Union organized a Working Group on Star Names (WGSN) to catalog and standardize proper names for stars. The WGSN approved the name Lilii Borea for this star on 5 September 2017 and it is now so included in the List of IAU-approved Star Names.

In Chinese, 胃宿 (Wèi Su), meaning Stomach, refers to an asterism consisting of 39 Arietis, 35 Arietis and 41 Arietis. Consequently, the Chinese name for 39 Arietis itself is 胃宿二 (Wèi Su èr, English: the Second Star of Stomach).

== Properties ==
39 Arietis is a giant star with a stellar classification of K1.5 III. It is currently at an evolutionary stage known as the red clump, indicating that it is generating energy through the fusion of helium at its core. It has 1.6 times the mass of the Sun, but its outer envelope has expanded to around 10 times the Sun's radius. It shines with 49 times the luminosity of the Sun. This energy is being radiated into outer space from its outer atmosphere at an effective temperature of 4,768 K, giving it the cool orange-hued glow of a K-type star.

== See also ==
- Aries (Chinese astronomy)
