= Alexander Jamieson =

Scottish writer and schoolmaster (1782–1850)

Alexander Jamieson (1782–1850) was a Scottish writer and schoolmaster, now best known as a rhetorician. He has been described as effectively a professional textbook writer. After the failure of his school, he worked as an actuary.

== Life ==
Some of Jamieson's background is obscure. He was born at Rothesay, Bute, to William Jamieson, a wheelwright, and Margaret Stewart. In 1821 he obtained a degree of M.A. from Marischal College, Aberdeen, and an LL.D. there in 1823. In 1825, he was admitted as a sizar at St John's College, Cambridge, and became a ten-year man. In 1826 he became a member of the Astronomical Society of London.

Jamieson was active in the period between 1814 and 1846, writing textbooks and running a school. In 1824, it was teaching at Heston House on Hounslow Heath, where some Hindustani was on the syllabus. From 1826 to 1838 it was at Wyke House Academy in Middlesex, which was advertised as a preparation for the Army, Navy, civil engineers, architects and surveyors. Among his pupils there was George Windsor Earl; John Rouse Bloxam also taught there.

Jamieson was declared bankrupt in 1838. He then worked as an actuary.

Towards the end of his life, he suffered a stroke, then moved to Bruges in Belgium with his wife, Frances (née Thurtle), known as a writer, whom he had married in 1820. She was the author of the relatively successful Ashford Rectory; or, The Spoiled Child Reformed. Containing a short introduction to the sciences of architecture and heraldry.... He died in Bruges on 6 July 1850.

== Works ==
Jamieson was the author of two highly successful grammars: A Grammar of Rhetoric and Polite Literature (1818, at least fifty-three American editions) and A Grammar of Logic and Intellectual Philosophy (1819 and at least ten American editions). The former drew on Hugh Blair's Lectures on Rhetoric and Belles Lettres, and the Philosophy of Rhetoric of George Campbell, of which Jamieson published an abridgement in 1823. Jamieson also abridged the Elements of Criticism by Lord Kames.

All these Scottish authors, along with Alexander Bain, were widely used in 19th-century American colleges for rhetoric texts; and the Grammar of Jamieson went through 24 editions by 1844. It quoted freely from Joseph Addison and Mark Akenside, as well as sources such as Shakespeare and John Milton, and was a typical text of the female education of the period. The Grammar of Rhetoric combined Blair, Campbell, and Kames with the Lectures on Belles Lettres and Logic (1806) of William Barron and the grammar of Lindley Murray.

Other works were:

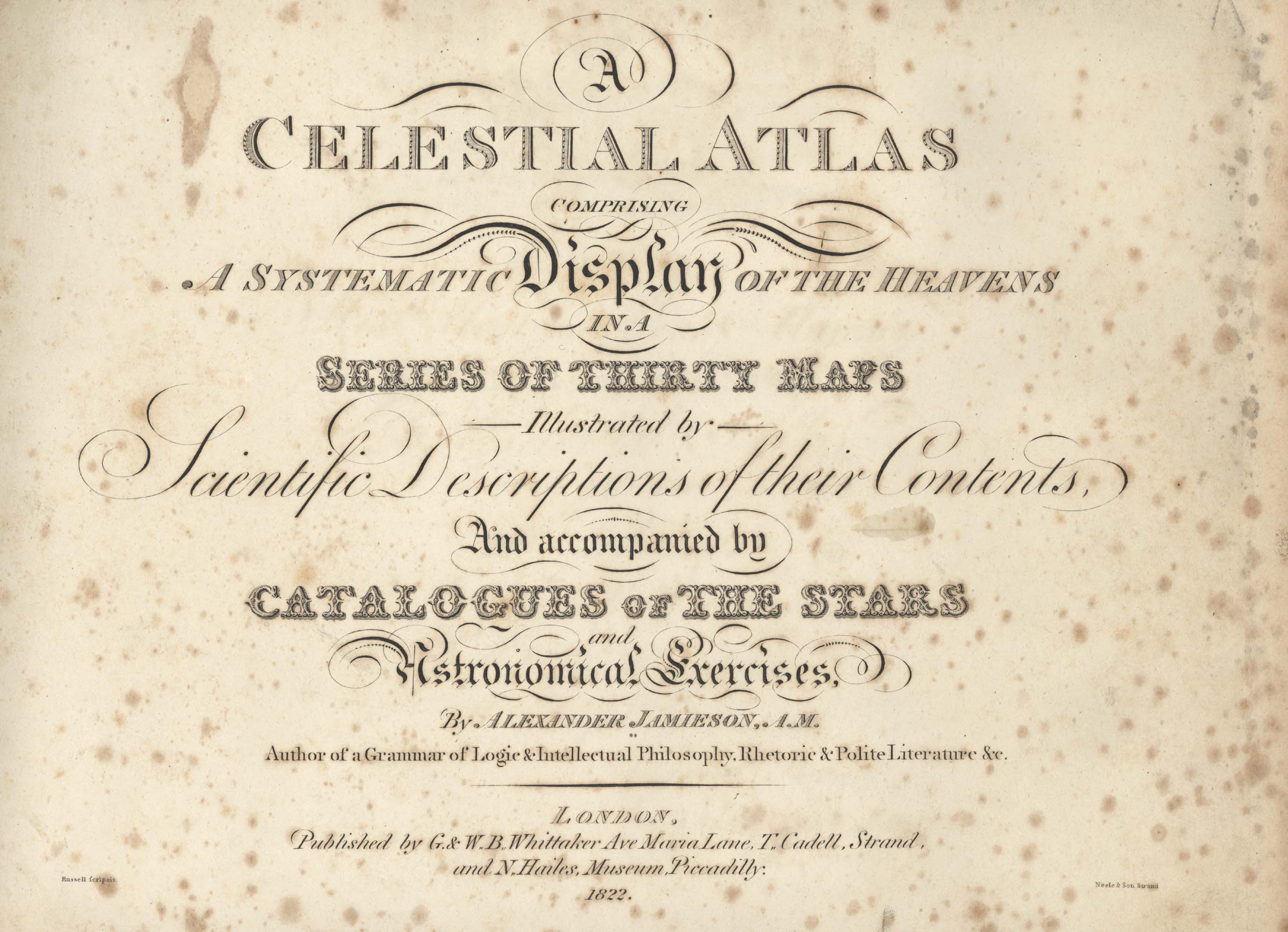
Cover of A Celestial Atlas by Alexander Jamieson

- A Treatise on the Construction of Maps
- A Grammar of Universal Geography (1820?, 1823)
- A Celestial Atlas (1822) This work was inspired by the star atlas of Johann Elert Bode, but restricted itself to stars that could be seen with the naked eye. It further inspired Urania's Mirror, a work that has been attributed to Richard Rouse Bloxam.
- Conversations on General History, exhibiting a Progressive View of the State of Mankind (2nd edition 1823)
- A Dictionary of Mechanical Science, Arts, Manufactures, and Miscellaneous Knowledge Volume 1 (1827), Volume 2 (1829)
- Mechanics of Fluids for Practical Men (1837)
- Report on the Constitution and Operations of Life Assurance Societies (1841)
- A Manual of Map-making and Mechanical Geography (1846)
- Elements of Algebra
