= Petrus Plancius =

Dutch-Flemish astronomer, cartographer and clergyman (1552–1622)

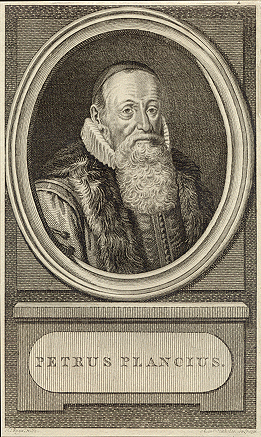
- Petrus Plancius, engraving by J. Buys after Reinier Vinkeles (1791)
- Born: Pieter Platevoet; 1552; Dranouter, Habsburg Netherlands
- Died: 15 May 1622 (aged 69–70)
- Known for: Contributions to Netherlandish cartography and the mapping of southern constellations
- Scientific career
- Fields: Astronomy, cartography, theology
- Workplaces: Dutch Reformed Church

Petrus Plancius (Dutch: [ˈpeːtrʏs ˈplɑŋkijʏs]; born Pieter Platevoet [ˈpitər ˈplaːtəvut]; 1552 – 15 May 1622) was a Dutch-Flemish astronomer, cartographer and clergyman. Born in Dranouter, now in Heuvelland, West Flanders, he studied theology in Germany and England. At the age of 24 he became a minister in the Dutch Reformed Church.

Plancius fled from Brussels to Amsterdam to avoid religious persecution by the Inquisition after the city fell into Spanish hands in 1585. In Amsterdam he became interested in navigation and cartography and, having access to nautical charts recently brought from Portugal, he was soon recognized as an expert on safe maritime routes to India and the nearby "spice islands". This enabled colonies and port trade in both, including what would become the Dutch East Indies, named after the Dutch East India Company set up in 1602.

He saw strong potential in the little-mapped Arctic Sea and strongly believed in the idea of a Northeast Passage until the failure of Willem Barentsz's third voyage in 1597 seemed to preclude its viability.

== Early life ==
Petrus Plancius was born Pieter Platevoet in 1552 in Dranouter, now part of Heuvelland in West Flanders, then in the Habsburg Netherlands. He studied theology in Germany and England and later Latinized his name to Petrus Plancius, as was common among scholars of the period.

== Career ==
At the age of 24 he became a minister in the Dutch Reformed Church.

Plancius served Protestant congregations in several cities in the southern Netherlands, including Mechelen, Leuven and Brussels. These years coincided with the religious conflicts of the Dutch Revolt. When Brussels fell to Spanish forces in 1585 and Protestant worship was suppressed, he fled to Amsterdam, like many Protestant clergy and intellectuals from the southern Netherlands.

He continued to serve as a minister of the Dutch Reformed Church in Amsterdam. At the same time, he developed an interest in navigation, astronomy and cartography, subjects that were closely connected with maritime exploration in the late sixteenth century. Access to Portuguese nautical charts and reports from overseas voyages soon brought him recognition as an expert on safe maritime routes to India and the nearby "spice islands". This enabled colonies and port trade in both, including what would become the Dutch East Indies, named after the Dutch East India Company set up in 1602.

He promoted the idea of a Northeast Passage through the Arctic and supported efforts to find it. Among these were the voyages of the Dutch navigator Willem Barentsz, whose third expedition (1596–1597) ended in failure.

== Southern constellations ==
In 1589 Plancius collaborated with the Amsterdam cartographer Jacob van Langren on a 32.5-cm celestial globe. Based on the limited information then available about the southern sky, the globe showed Crux (the Southern Cross), Triangulum Australe (the Southern Triangle), and the Magellanic Clouds (Nubecula Major and Nubecula Minor). This was among the first European attempts to depict these features on a celestial globe.

In 1595 Plancius trained Pieter Dirkszoon Keyser, the chief pilot on the Hollandia, to make astronomical observations to fill in the blank area around the south celestial pole on European maps of the southern sky. Keyser died in Java the following year – the expedition had many casualties – but his catalogue of 135 stars, probably developed with the help of Keyser's colleague Frederick de Houtman, was delivered to Plancius when the remaining ships returned.

These stars appear as twelve new southern constellations, on a 35-cm celestial globe designed by Plancius in late 1597 (or early 1598) and produced in collaboration with the Amsterdam cartographer Jodocus Hondius the Elder.

The twelve new constellations, largely derived from animals and subjects described in contemporary natural history and travel literature, are Apis (the Bee, later renamed Musca by Lacaille), Apus (the Bird of Paradise), Chamaeleon, Dorado (the Goldfish or Swordfish), Grus (the Crane), Hydrus (the Small Water Snake), Indus (the Indian), Pavo (the Peacock), Phoenix, Triangulum Australe (the Southern Triangle), Tucana (the Toucan), and Volans (the Flying Fish).

Triangulum Australe and Crux (the Southern Cross) had been reported earlier as asterisms by navigators and appear on earlier charts, but the globe of 1598 is the first surviving source to plot their positions with reasonable accuracy.

The globe also includes Achernar, identified as Alpha Eridani.

These constellations, together with Columba illustrated by Plancius on his large wall map of the world of 1592, were incorporated in 1603 by Johann Bayer in his sky atlas, the Uranometria.

== Maps and globes ==
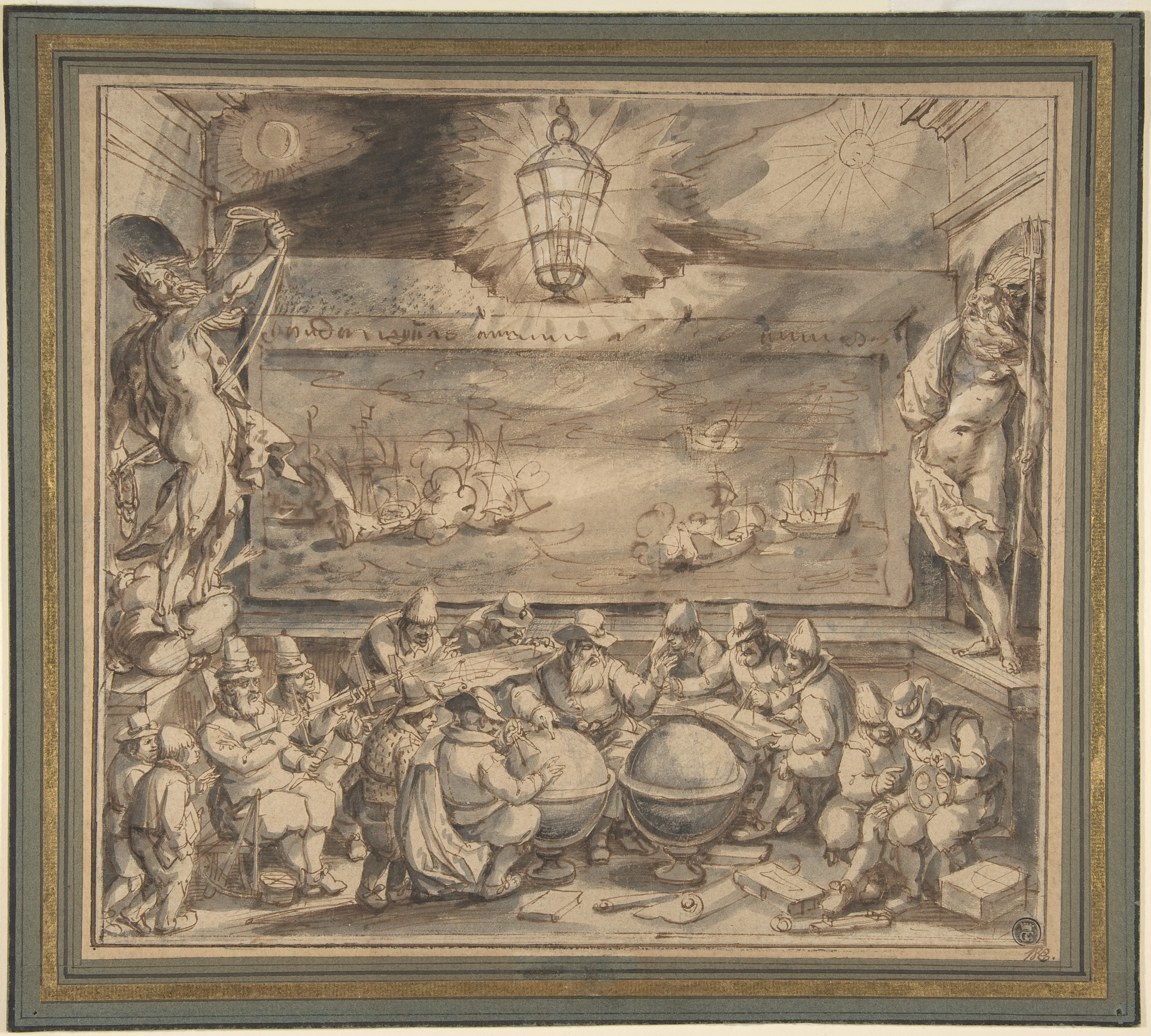
Petrus Plancius Instructing Students in the Science of Navigation, by David Vinckboons

In 1592 Plancius published his best known world map, titled "Nova et exacta Terrarum Orbis Tabula geographica ac hydrographica". Only one remaining copy is known to exist, preserved at the Colegio del Corpus Christi in Valencia, Spain. This copy is not easily accessible to visitors. Plancius also published journals and navigational guides and developed a new method for determining longitude. He also promoted the Mercator projection for navigational maps. Plancius was an investor in the Dutch East India Company, for which he drew over 100 maps.

Plancius was closely acquainted with Henry Hudson, an explorer of the New World.

Plancius prepared the map, Exacta & accurata delinatio… regionibus China, Cauchinchina, Camboja, sive Champa, Syao, Malacca, Arracan & Pegu, published in Jan Huygen van Linschoten's popular book, Itinerario (1596).

In 1612 (or 1613) Plancius introduced the following eight constellations on a 26.5-cm celestial globe published in Amsterdam by Pieter van der Keere: Apes the Bee, Camelopardalis the Giraffe (often interpreted as a Camel), Cancer Minor the Small Crab, Euphrates Fluvius et Tigris Fluvius the Rivers Euphrates and Tigris, Gallus the Cock, Jordanis Fluvius the River Jordan, Monoceros the Unicorn and Sagitta Australis the Southern Arrow. Of the latter constellations, only Camelopardalis and Monoceros are still found on modern star charts, and recognized by the IAU.

== Legacy ==
The minor planet 10648 Plancius commemorates his contributions in celestial and terrestrial cartography.

== Gallery ==
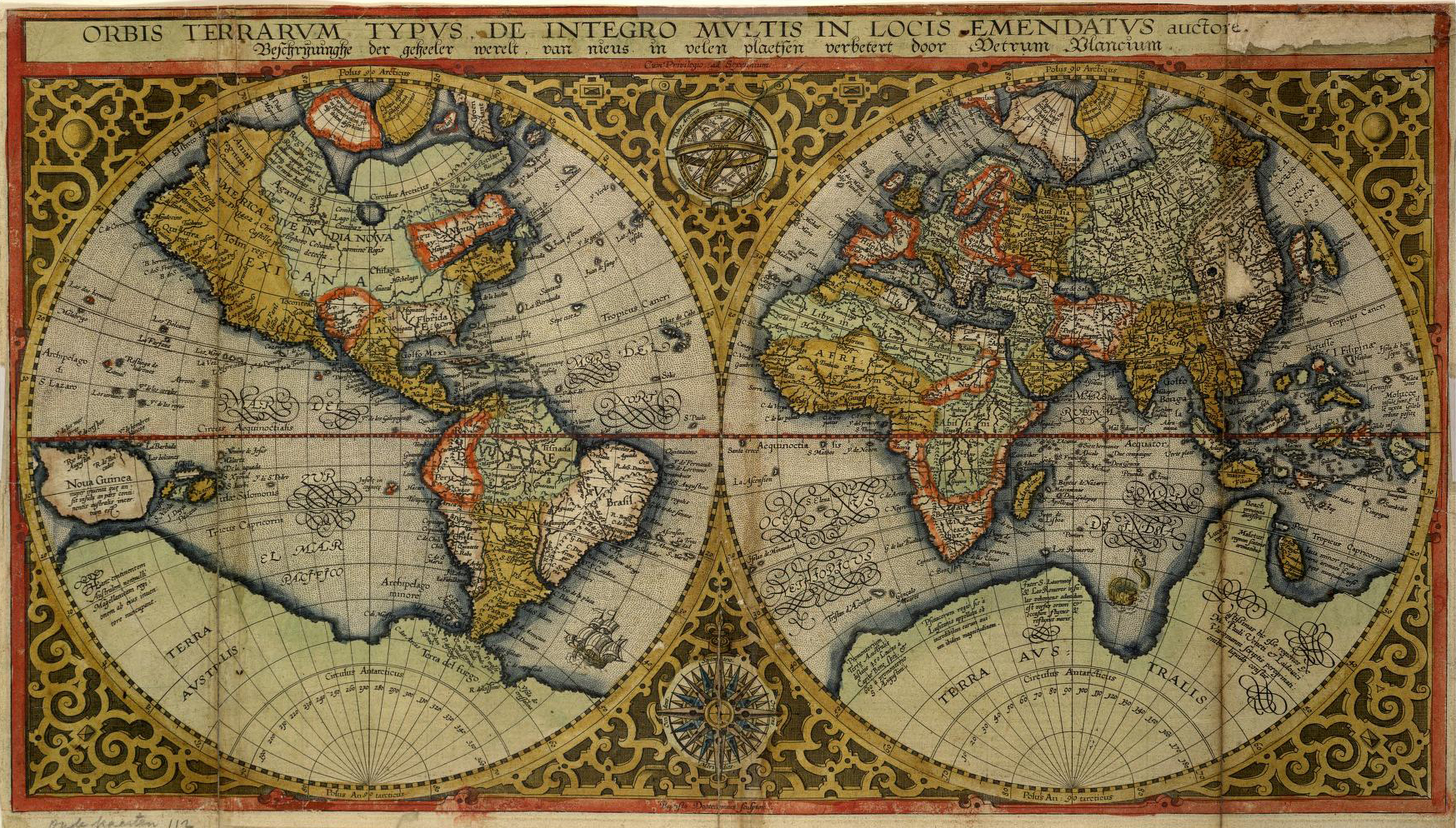
Orbis Terrarum 1590

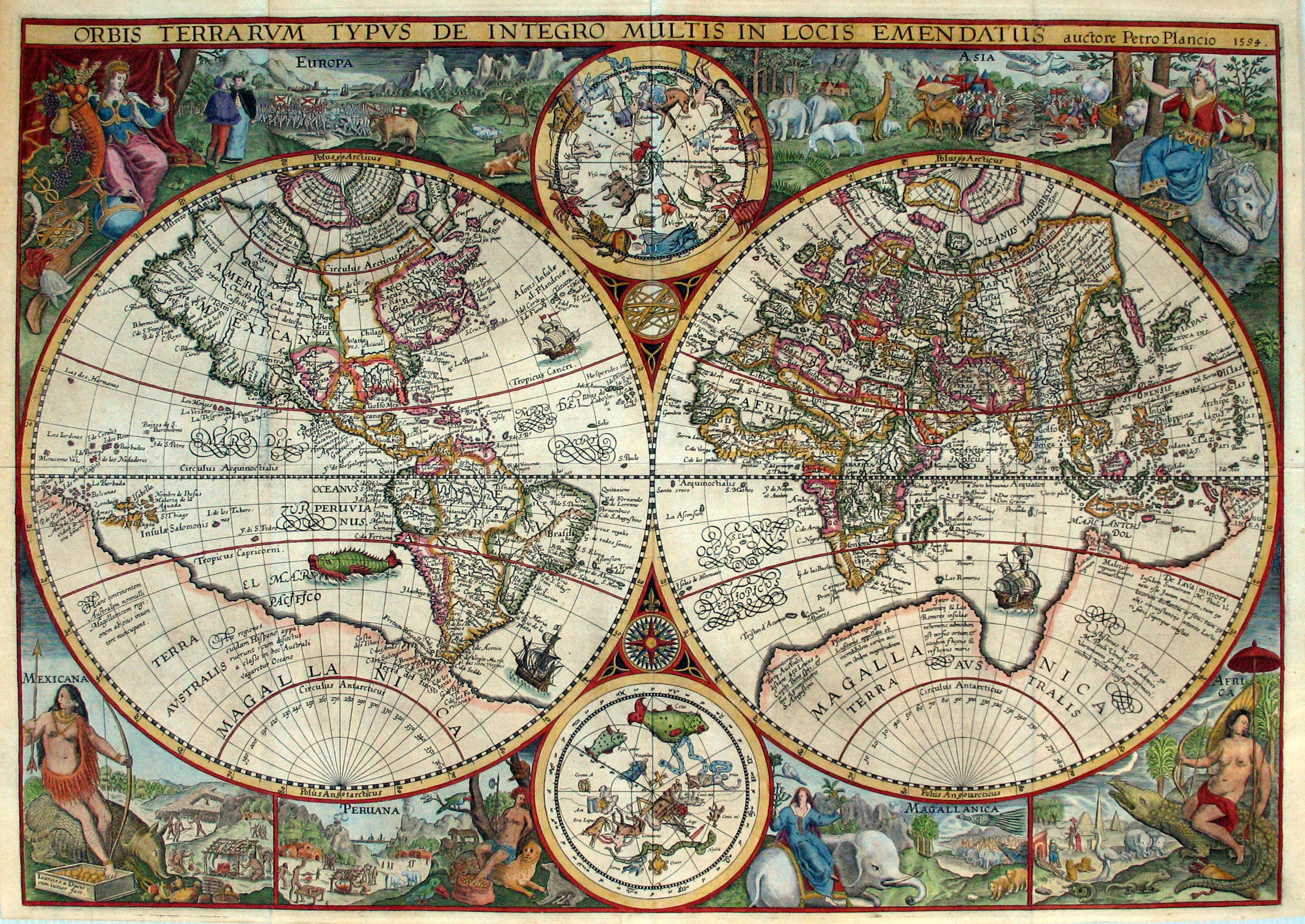
Orbis Terrarum 1594

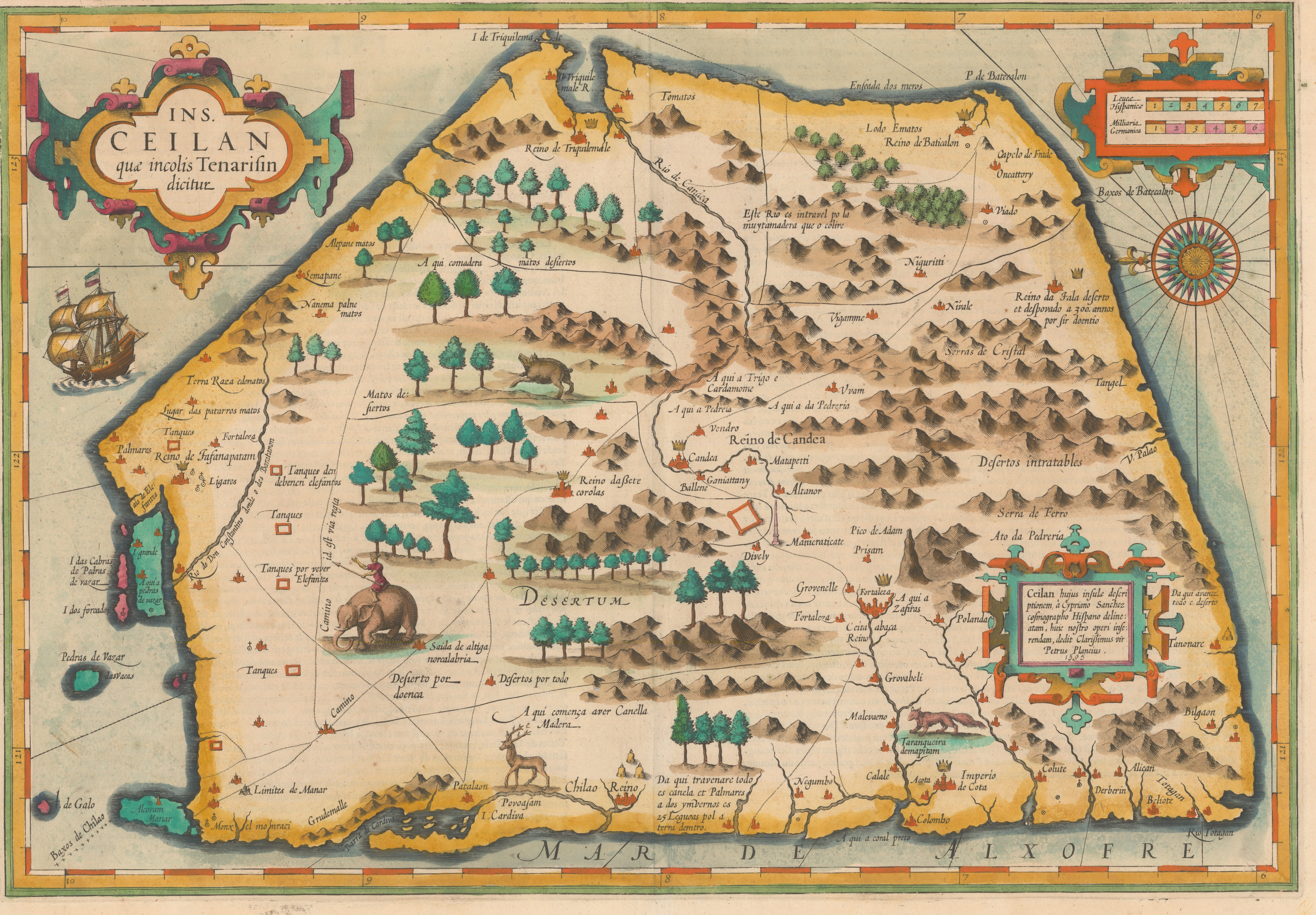
Ceilan, 1595

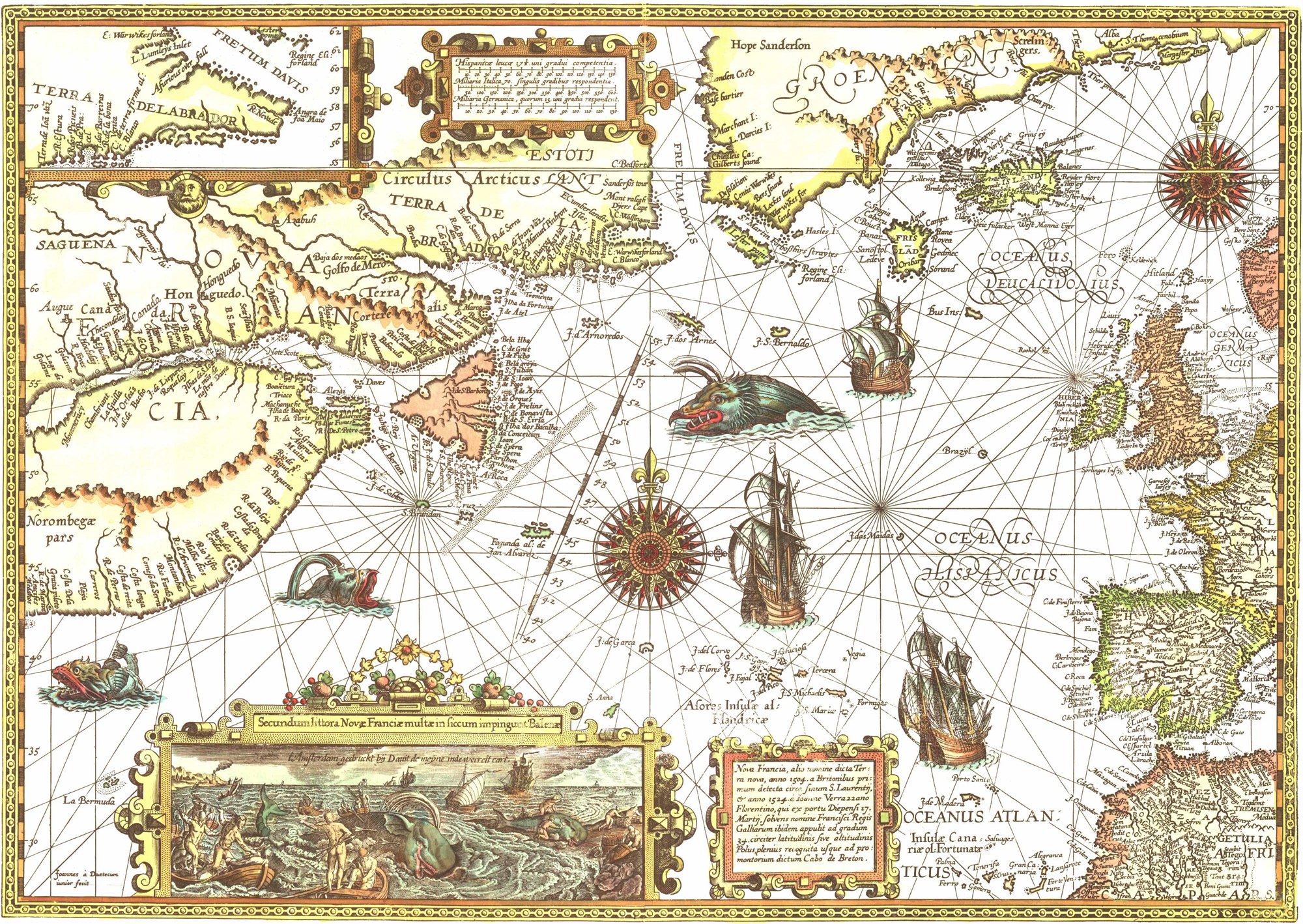
Nova Francia .. Terra Nova 1592

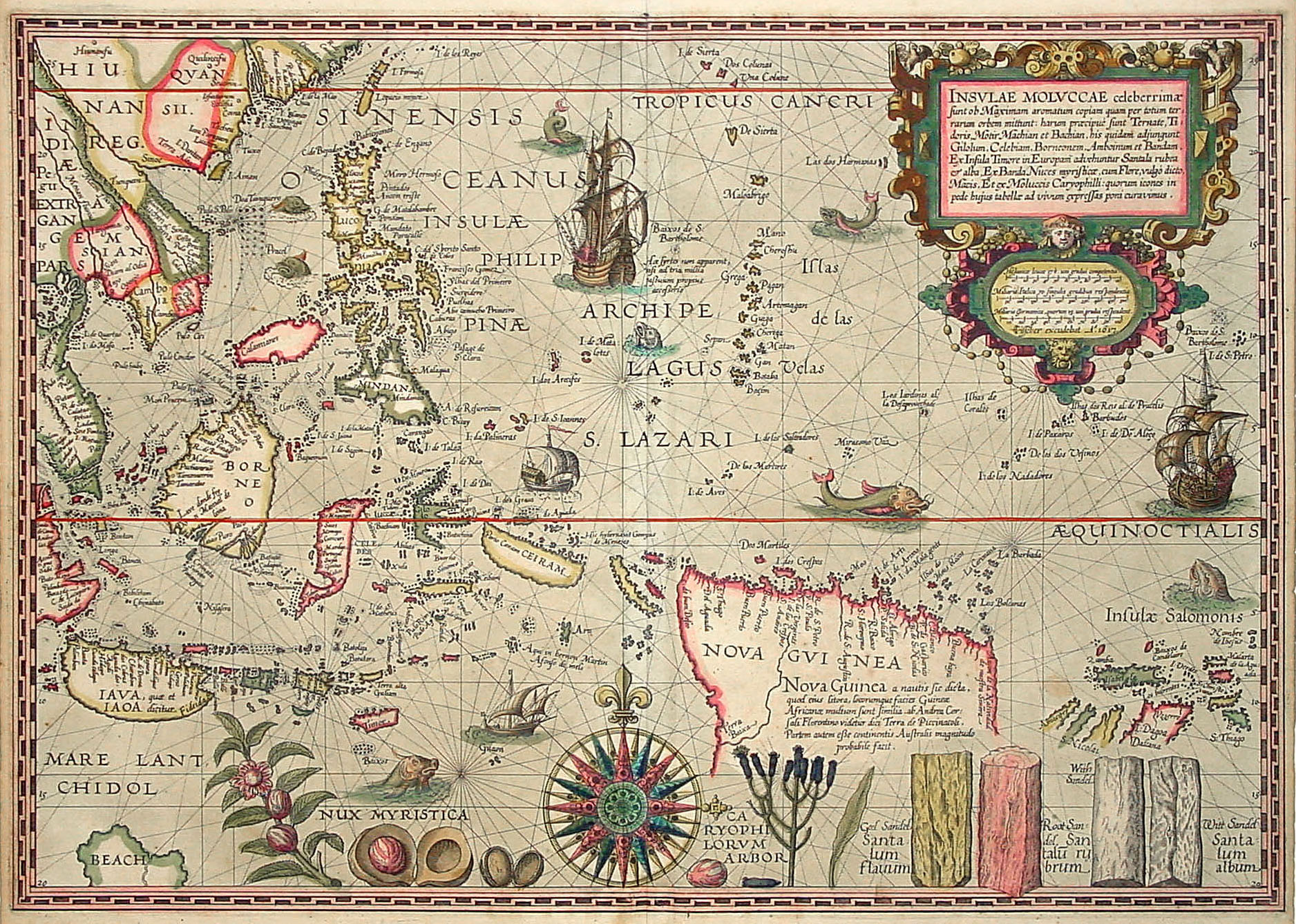
Insulae Moluccae 1592

== See also ==
- First Dutch Expedition to Indonesia
