= 35 Arietis =

Star in the constellation Aries

- Location of 35 Arietis (circled in red)

Observation data Epoch J2000 Equinox ICRS
- Constellation: Aries
- Right ascension: 02^{h} 43^{m} 27.11185^{s}
- Declination: +27° 42′ 25.7233″
- Apparent magnitude (V): 4.64

Characteristics
- Spectral type: B3 V
- U−B color index: −0.62
- B−V color index: −0.14

Astrometry
Radial velocity (R_{v})	+13 km/s
Proper motion (μ)	RA: +2.06 mas/yr Dec.: −10.37 mas/yr
Parallax (π)	9.51±0.85 mas
Distance	340 ± 30 ly (105 ± 9 pc)

Details
Mass	5.7±0.3 M_{☉}
Radius	2.2–3.9 R_{☉}
Luminosity	870 L_{☉}
Temperature	17,520 K
Rotational velocity (v sin i)	90 km/s
Age	5.5±4.7 Myr

Other designations
- Weixiu, 35 Ari, BD+27°424, FK5 94, HD 16908, HIP 12719, HR 801, SAO 75532

Database references
SIMBAD	data

35 Arietis, also named Weixiu, is a binary star in the northern constellation of Aries. 35 Arietis is the Flamsteed designation, which is abbreviated 35 Ari. It is approximately 340 light-years (100 parsecs) distant from the Earth, based upon an annual parallax shift of 9.51 mas. This star is visible to the naked eye with an apparent visual magnitude of 4.64.

This is a single-lined spectroscopic binary system, with the presence of a companion being demonstrated by shifts in the spectrum of the primary component. The pair orbit each other with a period of 490.0 days and an eccentricity of 0.14. The primary is a B-type main-sequence star with a stellar classification of B3 V. With a mass around 5.7 times that of the Sun, it is radiating 870 times the Sun's luminosity. This energy is being emitted from the outer atmosphere at an effective temperature of 17,520 K, causing it to shine with the blue-white hue of a B-type star.

This star was formerly located in the obsolete Western constellation Musca Borealis, also known as Lilium. In Chinese astronomy, this star is part of the constellation Wèi (胃, Stomach), which marks the 17th of the Twenty-Eight Mansions, Wèi Xiù (胃宿). It represents the stomach of the White Tiger. The IAU Working Group on Star Names adopted the name Weixiu for this star on 15 October 2026, after the Chinese constellation.
