= Solitaire (disambiguation) =

Solitaire is a genre of single-player card games.

Solitaire may also refer to:

== Games ==
- Klondike (solitaire), a card game, also known as solitaire in North America
- Microsoft Solitaire, a computer game
- Mahjong solitaire, a tile game
- Peg solitaire, a board game called "solitaire" outside of the U.S.
- Solitaire, a non-player character from Dragon Quest Monsters: Joker

== Film and television ==
- Le Solitaire, a 1987 French film
- Solitaire (1991 film), a Canadian drama film
- Solitaire (2008 film), a drama film
- Solitaire, 2016 Lebanese comedy film with Bassam Kousa
- "Solitaire", a 1977 episode of Police Woman
- "Solitaire", a 1996 episode of Dave's World
- Solitaire (James Bond), a character in Live and Let Die
- Solitaire Island, a fictional island in the 1995 "Watergate" episode of seaQuest DSV

== Literature ==
- Solitaire (comics), a 1993 superhero comic book series
- Solitaire (Eskridge novel), a 2002 novel by Kelley Eskridge
- Solitaire (audio drama), a 2010 Doctor Who audiobook
- Solitaire (Oseman novel), a 2014 novel by Alice Oseman

== Music ==
- The Solitaires, an American doo wop group
- Solitaire (musician) or James Callahan (born 1965), a 1980s synth pop performer
- Solitair (born 1975), hip-hop MC and producer from Toronto
- Solitaire, a dance music duo consisting of Dave Taylor and Pump Friction

=== Albums ===
- Solitaire (Edenbridge album) (2010)
- Solitaire (Neil Sedaka album) (1972)
- Solitaire (Andy Williams album) (1973)
- Solitaire (Uri Caine album) (2001)
- Solitaire, a 2002 album by Doc Gynéco
- Solitaire, a 2014 album by Shy'm

=== Songs ===
- "The Way"/"Solitaire", a 2004 double A-side by Clay Aiken
- "Solitaire" (Martine Clémenceau song) (1981), covered by Laura Branigan in 1983
- "Solitaire" (Neil Sedaka song) (1972), covered by the Carpenters in 1975
- "Solitaires", a 2020 song by Future
- "Solitaire", a 1973 song and 1993 single by Tony Christie
- "Solitaire", a 1993 song by Deep Purple from The Battle Rages On...
- "Solitaire", a 1955 song by Erroll Garner
- "Solitaire", a 2007 song by Kamelot from Ghost Opera
- "Solitaire", a 2012 song by Kamelot from Silverthorn
- "Solitaire", a 2015 song by Marina and the Diamonds from Froot
- "Solitaire", a 2009 song by Wilco from Wilco (The Album)
- "Solitaire", a 2025 song by Lynden Stone

== Transportation and military ==
- Solitaire (1971 ship), a 1971 pipe-laying ship
- French ship Solitaire (1774) or HMS Solitaire
- HMS Solitaire, a ship of the Royal Navy
- Rutan Solitaire, a motorglider
- Solitaire, a variant of the Mitsubishi MU-2 aircraft

== Wildlife ==
- Solitaire (bird), a bird group in the thrush family
- Night parrot, Pezoporus occidentalis, or solitaire, an endangered bird of Australia
- Réunion solitaire, Threskiornis solitarius, an extinct bird
- Rodrigues solitaire, Pezophaps solitaria, an extinct bird

== Other uses ==
- Solitaire (ballet), a 1956 ballet by Kenneth MacMillan
- Solitaire (cipher), a cryptographic algorithm
- Solitaire (jewellery), a single jewel, such as a diamond, set alone
- Solitaire, Namibia, a settlement
- Solitaires of Port-Royal, a 17th-century French community
- The proper name of the star 58 Hydrae
- Solitaire Townsend

== See also ==
- List of patience games
- Saltair (disambiguation)
- Saltaire, a Victorian model village near Bradford, England
- Solitary (disambiguation)
- Solitair Brickell, a high rise under construction in Miami
