= Solitude (disambiguation) =

Solitude is a state of personal isolation from others.

Solitude may also refer to:

== People ==
- La Mulâtresse Solitude, a heroine of the struggle against slavery in Guadeloupe.

== Places ==
- Castle Solitude (Schloss Solitude), a rococo palace in Stuttgart, Germany
  - Solitude Racetrack (Solitudering), a former racetrack in and near Stuttgart, Germany (1903–1965)
- Solitude, Indiana, an unincorporated community in Posey County, Indiana
- Solitude, Kentucky, an unincorporated community in Bullitt County, Kentucky
- Solitude, United States Virgin Islands, a settlement on the island of Saint Croix in the United States Virgin Islands
- Solitude, Virginia, an unincorporated community in Botetourt County, Virginia
- Solitude (Blacksburg, Virginia), a historic home located on the campus of Virginia Polytechnic Institute
- Solitude Mountain Resort, a ski area in Utah

== Music ==
- Solitude Aeturnus, formerly Solitude, an American metal band

=== Albums ===
- Solitude (Billie Holiday album) or the title cover of the Duke Ellington song (see below), 1956
- Solitude (King Midas Sound album), 2019
- Solitude (The The album) or the title song, 1993
- Solitude (EP), by Tori Kelly, 2020
- Solitude, by Frank Duval, 1991
- Solitude, by Gunmetal Grey
- Solitude, by Kosheen, 2013
- Solitude, by Morris Albert, 1981

=== Songs ===
- "(In My) Solitude", composed by Duke Ellington, 1934
- "Solitude" (Candlemass song), 1986
- "Solitude" (Black Sabbath song), 1971
- "Solitude", by Days of the New from Days of the New, 1997
- "Solitude", by Jerry Cantrell from Degradation Trip Volumes 1 & 2, 2002
- "Solitude", by Joe Satriani from Black Swans and Wormhole Wizards, 2010
- "Solitude", by Gothminister from Anima Inferna, 2011
- "Solitude", by Northlane from Discoveries, 2011
- "Solitude", by M83 from Junk, 2016

== Other ==
- Solitude (football ground), the oldest football stadium in Ireland
- "Solitude" (Supergirl), an episode of the CBS television series Supergirl
- Solitude Trilogy, a 1992 documentary by pianist Glenn Gould
- "Solitude", a poem by Ella Wheeler Wilcox
- Solitude (Bazovský), a painting by Miloš Alexander Bazovský from 1957
- La Mulâtresse Solitude, a Guadeloupean freedom fighter
- Solitude, the capital city of Skyrim in The Elder Scrolls V: Skyrim

== See also ==
- Solitary (disambiguation)
- The Solitude Mansion, a colonial-era mansion in Fairmount Park, Philadelphia (named after Castle Solitude)
- Solitudes, a brand of music created by Dan Gibson
- Zolitūde, a city district of Riga (Latvia)
- Zolitūde Station, railway stop in Zolitūde district of Riga
