= Solitary =

Solitary is the state of being alone or in solitude. The term may refer to:

- Solitary (album), 2008 album by Don Dokken
- Solitary (2020 film), a British sci-fi thriller film
- Solitary (upcoming film), an American drama film
- "Solitary" (Lost), a 2004 episode of the TV series Lost
- Solitary (TV series), a reality show made by FOX
- Solitary animal, an animal that does not live with others in its species
- Solitary confinement, a form of imprisonment
- Solitary Mountain, a mountain in Yukon, Canada
- A hermit in many Christian religious orders

== See also ==
- Solitaire (disambiguation)
- Solitude (disambiguation)
- Loner, a person who does not seek out, or actively avoids, interaction with others
