= Solitude (Bazovský) =

1957 painting by Miloš Alexander Bazovský

- Samota (Slovak)
- Artist: Miloš Alexander Bazovský
- Year: 1957
- Medium: oil on canvas
- Dimensions: 54.3 cm × 84.5 cm (21.4 in × 33.3 in)
- Location: Slovak National Gallery, Bratislava

Solitude (Slovak: Samota) is a painting by Miloš Alexander Bazovský from 1957.

== Description ==
The painting was created in 1957. It has the dimensions 54.3 x 84.5 centimeters. It is in the collection of the Slovak National Gallery.

== Analysis ==
Bazovský was a modern Slovak painter who portrayed folk life in an iconic style.
