= 58 Hydrae =

Star in the constellation Hydra

- Location of 58 Hydrae (circled in red)

Observation data Epoch J2000 Equinox ICRS
- Constellation: Hydra
- Right ascension: 14^{h} 50^{m} 17.30146^{s}
- Declination: −27° 57′ 37.3385″
- Apparent magnitude (V): 4.42

Characteristics
- Evolutionary stage: red giant branch
- Spectral type: K2.5 IIIb Fe-1:
- B−V color index: 1.366±0.050

Astrometry
Radial velocity (R_{v})	−8.7±1.5 km/s
Proper motion (μ)	RA: −232.696 mas/yr Dec.: −60.118 mas/yr
Parallax (π)	11.4440±0.5105 mas
Distance	290 ± 10 ly (87 ± 4 pc)
Absolute magnitude (M_{V})	−0.60

Details
Mass	0.88 M_{☉}
Radius	33.40+0.41 −1.13 R_{☉}
Luminosity	310.19 L_{☉}
Surface gravity (log g)	1.35 cgs
Temperature	4,210 K
Metallicity [Fe/H]	−0.43±0.04 dex
Rotational velocity (v sin i)	4.23 km/s
Age	8.1 Gyr

Other designations
- Solitaire, E Hya, 58 Hya, CD−27°10073, HD 130694, HIP 72571, HR 5526, SAO 182911, LTT 5887

Database references
SIMBAD	data

58 Hydrae, also named Solitaire, is a single star in the equatorial constellation of Hydra, located around 290 light years away from the Sun based on parallax. It has the Bayer designation E Hydrae; 58 Hydrae is the Flamsteed designation − a later designation of 6 Librae. It is visible to the naked eye as a faint, orange-hued star with an apparent visual magnitude of 4.42. This object is moving closer to the Earth with a heliocentric radial velocity of −9 km/s.

This is an aging giant star with a stellar classification of K2.5 IIIb Fe-1:, most likely (98% chance) on the red giant branch. The suffix notation indicates an underabundance of iron in the spectrum, and some uncertainty about the classification. It is around 8.1 billion years old with 0.88 times the mass of the Sun. As a consequence of exhausting the hydrogen at its core, the star has expanded to 33.4 times the Sun's radius. It is radiating 310 times the luminosity of the Sun from its swollen photosphere at an effective temperature of 4,210 K.

This star was a member of the obsolete constellation Turdus Solitarius, which was named after the Rodrigues solitaire, a now extinct species of bird, though in old star charts it was illustrated as a blue rock thrush. The IAU Working Group on Star Names approved the name Solitaire for this star on 31 October 2024, after the obsolete constellation, and it is now so entered in the IAU Catalog of Star Names.
