= Saltair =

Saltair or Saltaire or salt air or variant, may refer to:

== Places ==
- Saltair, British Columbia, Canada
- Saltair, Ohio, United States
- Saltaire, a village and UNESCO world heritage site in West Yorkshire, England, UK
  - Saltaire railway station
- Saltaire, New York, a village in Suffolk County, United States
- Saltair (Utah), former resorts near the Great Salt Lake in Utah, United States

== Other uses ==
- Saltaire Festival, Saltaire, England, UK
- Salt air
- Salt Air, airline

== See also ==
- Salt (disambiguation)
- Air (disambiguation)
- Aire (disambiguation)
- Solitaire (disambiguation)
- Saltire
