= Turdus Solitarius =

Former constellation

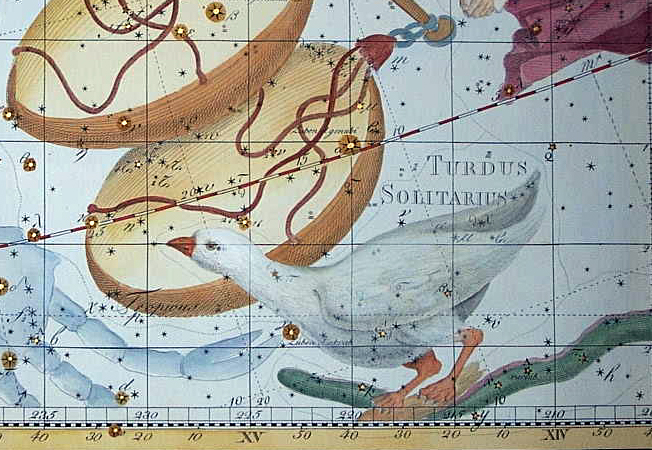

Turdus Solitarius (Latin for solitary thrush) was a constellation created by French astronomer Pierre Charles Le Monnier in 1776 from stars of Hydra's tail. It was named after the Rodrigues solitaire, an extinct flightless bird that was endemic to the island of Rodrigues East of Madagascar in the Indian Ocean. It was replaced by another constellation, Noctua (the Owl), in A Celestial Atlas (1822) by the British amateur astronomer Alexander Jamieson, but neither was adopted by the International Astronomical Union among its 88 recognized constellations.

The IAU Working Group on Star Names approved the name Solitaire for the star E Hydrae in 2024, after the obsolete constellation.

== See also ==
- Former constellations
