= Miloš Alexander Bazovský =

Slovak painter

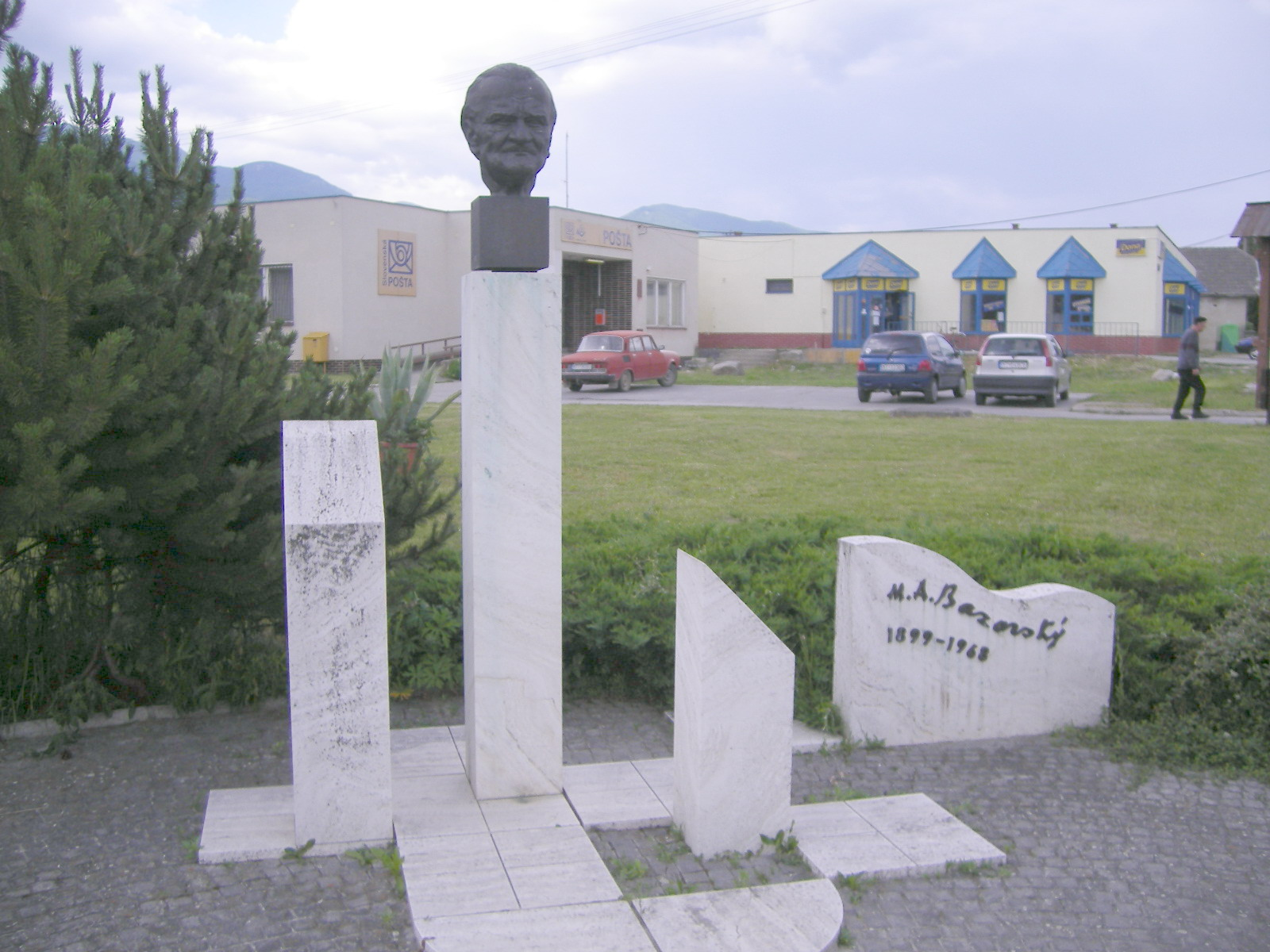

Miloš Alexander Bazovský (11 January 1899 in Turany nad Váhom – 15 December 1968 in Trenčín) was a Slovak painter.

He was often ranked among the most prominent figures of 20th-century art from Slovakia.

== Selected solo exhibitions ==
- Miloš Alexander Bazovský, Slovak National Gallery, Bratislava, Slovakia, 1960
- Miloš Alexander Bazovský - 1899 -1968, Slovak National Gallery, Bratislava, Slovakia, 1999
- Miloš Alexander Bazovský - 1899 -1968, Turiec Gallery, Martin, Slovakia, 1999
- Miloš Alexander Bazovský - 1899 -1968, Gallery of M. A. Bazovsky, Trenčín, Slovakia, 1999
- Miloš Alexander Bazovský, The Slovak Institute in Budapest, Bratislava, Slovakia, 2009
- Miloš Alexander Bazovský, Jan Koniarek Gallery, Trnava, Slovakia, 2010

== Selected group exhibitions ==
- IV Bienal Do Museu De Arte Moderna De São Paulo, São Paulo, Brazil, 1957
- 33rd Venice Biennale, Venice, Italy, 1966
- 50 let československého malířství 1918 - 1968, Valdštejnská jízdárna, Prague, Italy, 1968
