= Solitary Mountain =

Mountain in Yukon, Canada

Highest point
- Elevation: 1,858 m (6,096 ft)
- Prominence: 653 m (2,142 ft)
- Coordinates: 61°58′17″N 134°07′38″W

Geography
- Location: Yukon, Canada
- Parent range: Big Salmon Range
- Topo map: NTS 105E16 Solitary Mountain

Geology
- Rock age: Late Cretaceous

Solitary Mountain is a mountain in the Big Salmon Range of the Pelly Mountains in southcentral Yukon, Canada, located 49 km (30 mi) southwest of Faro. It is named for its isolation and is south of the Robert Campbell Highway.

Solitary Mountain consists of Late Cretaceous volcanics of the Carmacks Group, a 63,000 km^{2} (24,000 mi^{2}) volcanic group that formed about 70 million years ago. Unlike much of the Carmacks Group, the volcanics comprising Solitary Mountain are separated by the large strike-slip Teslin Fault.
