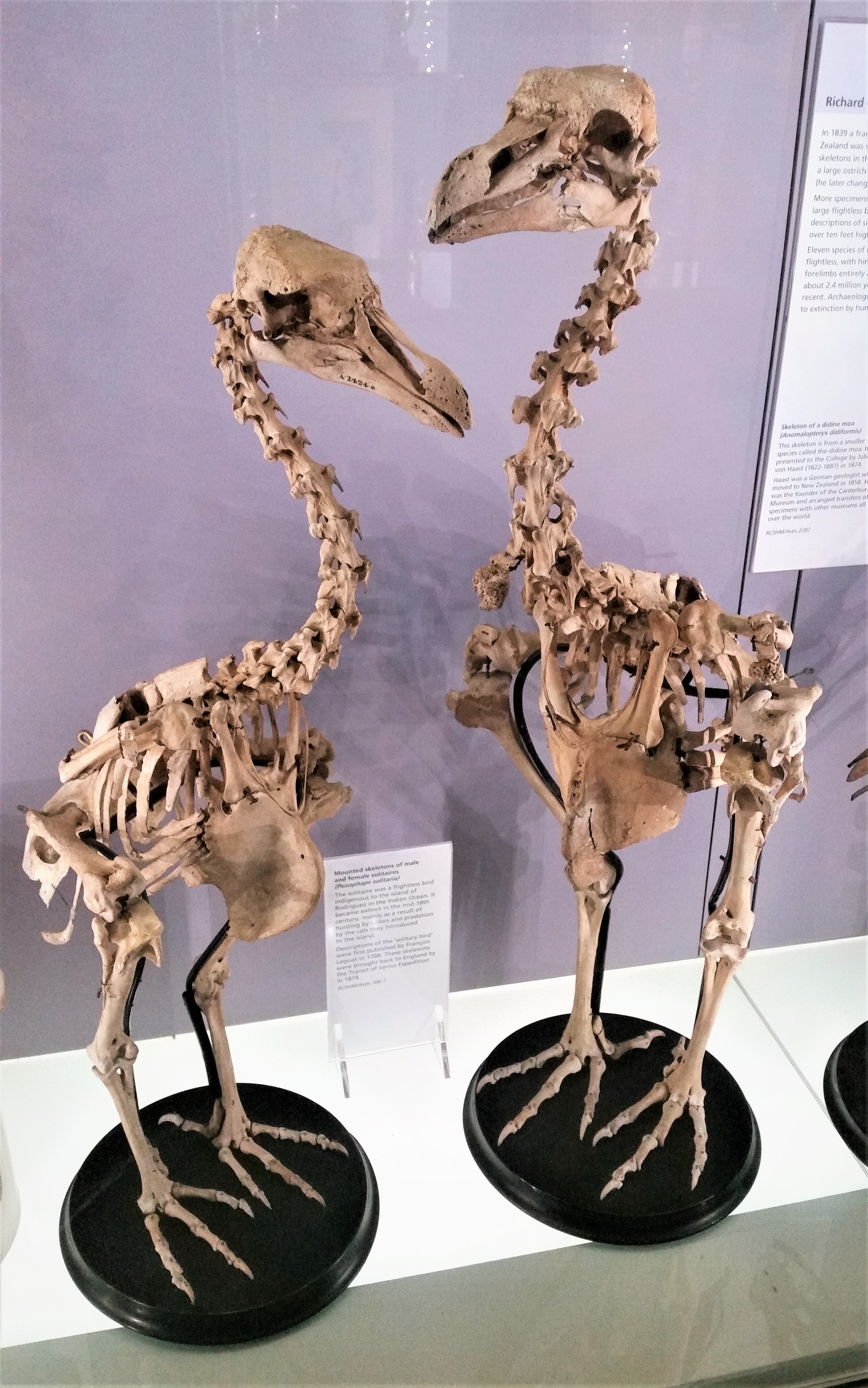
- Skeletons of a female and a male, displayed at the Hunterian Museum, Glasgow

Conservation status
- Extinct (mid-18th century) (IUCN 3.1)

Scientific classification
- Kingdom: Animalia
- Phylum: Chordata
- Class: Aves
- Order: Columbiformes
- Family: Columbidae
- Subtribe: †Raphina
- Genus: †Pezophaps; Strickland, 1848
- Species: †P. solitaria

Binomial name
- †Pezophaps solitaria (Gmelin, 1789)
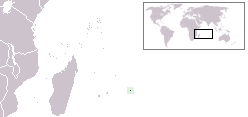
- Location of Rodrigues

Synonyms
- List: Didus solitarius Gmelin, 1789; Pezophaps solitarius Strickland, 1848; Didus nazarenus Bartlett, 1851; Pezophaps minor Strickland, 1852

= Rodrigues solitaire =

Rodrigues solitaire Temporal range: Holocene

Extinct, flightless bird that was endemic to Rodrigues

The Rodrigues solitaire (Pezophaps solitaria) is an extinct flightless bird that was endemic to the island of Rodrigues, east of Madagascar in the Indian Ocean. A member of the family of pigeons and doves, it was most closely related to the also extinct dodo of the nearby island Mauritius, the two forming the subfamily Raphinae. The Nicobar pigeon is their closest living genetic relative.

Rodrigues solitaires grew to the size of swans, and demonstrated pronounced sexual dimorphism. Males were much larger than females and measured up to 75.7–90 centimetres (30–35 inches) in height and 28 kilograms (62 pounds) in weight, contrasting with 63.8–70 centimetres (25–28 in) and 17 kilograms (37 lb) for females. Its plumage was grey and brown; the female was paler than the male. It had a black band at the base of its slightly hooked beak, and its neck and legs were long. Gizzard stones helped digest its food, which included fruit and seeds. Both sexes were highly territorial, with large bony knobs on their wings that were used in combat, probably due to competition for the limited resources on the island. The Rodrigues solitaire laid a single egg that was incubated in turn by both sexes.

First mentioned during the 17th century, the Rodrigues solitaire was described in detail by François Leguat, the leader of a group of French Huguenot refugees who were marooned on Rodrigues in 1691–1693. It was hunted by humans and introduced animals, and was extinct by the late 18th century. Apart from Leguat's account and drawing, and a few other contemporary descriptions, nothing was known about the bird until a few subfossil bones were found in a cave in 1786. Thousands of bones have subsequently been excavated. It is the only extinct bird with a former constellation named after it, Turdus Solitarius.

== Taxonomy ==
The French explorer François Leguat was the first to refer to the bird as the "solitaire" (referring to its solitary habits), but it has been suggested that he borrowed the name from a 1689 tract by his sponsor Marquis Henri Duquesne, which used the name "solitaire" in reference to the Réunion ibis. The bird was first scientifically named in 1789 as a species of dodo (Didus solitarius, based on Leguat's description) by the German naturalist Johann Friedrich Gmelin in the thirteenth edition of Systema Naturae.

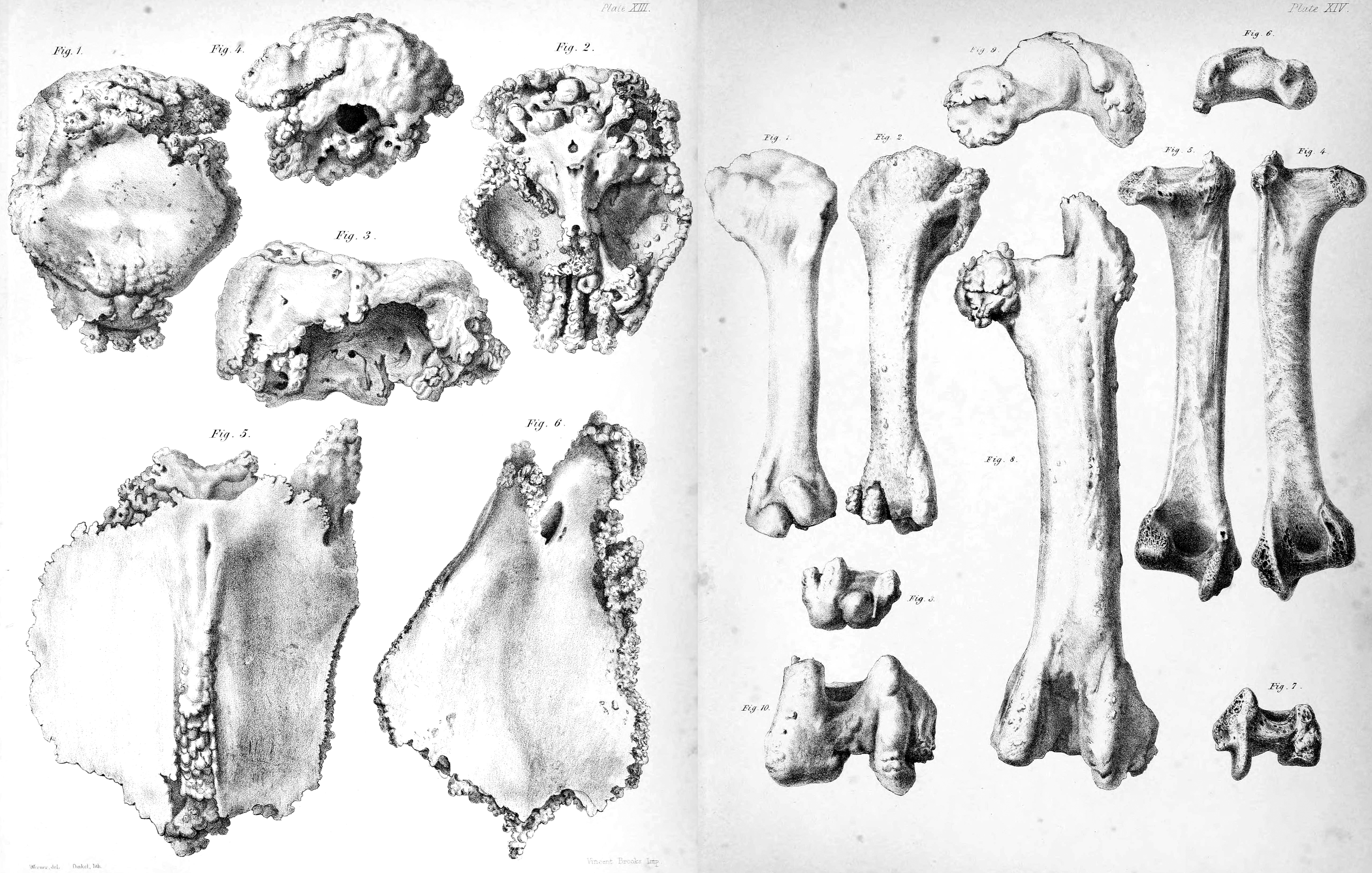
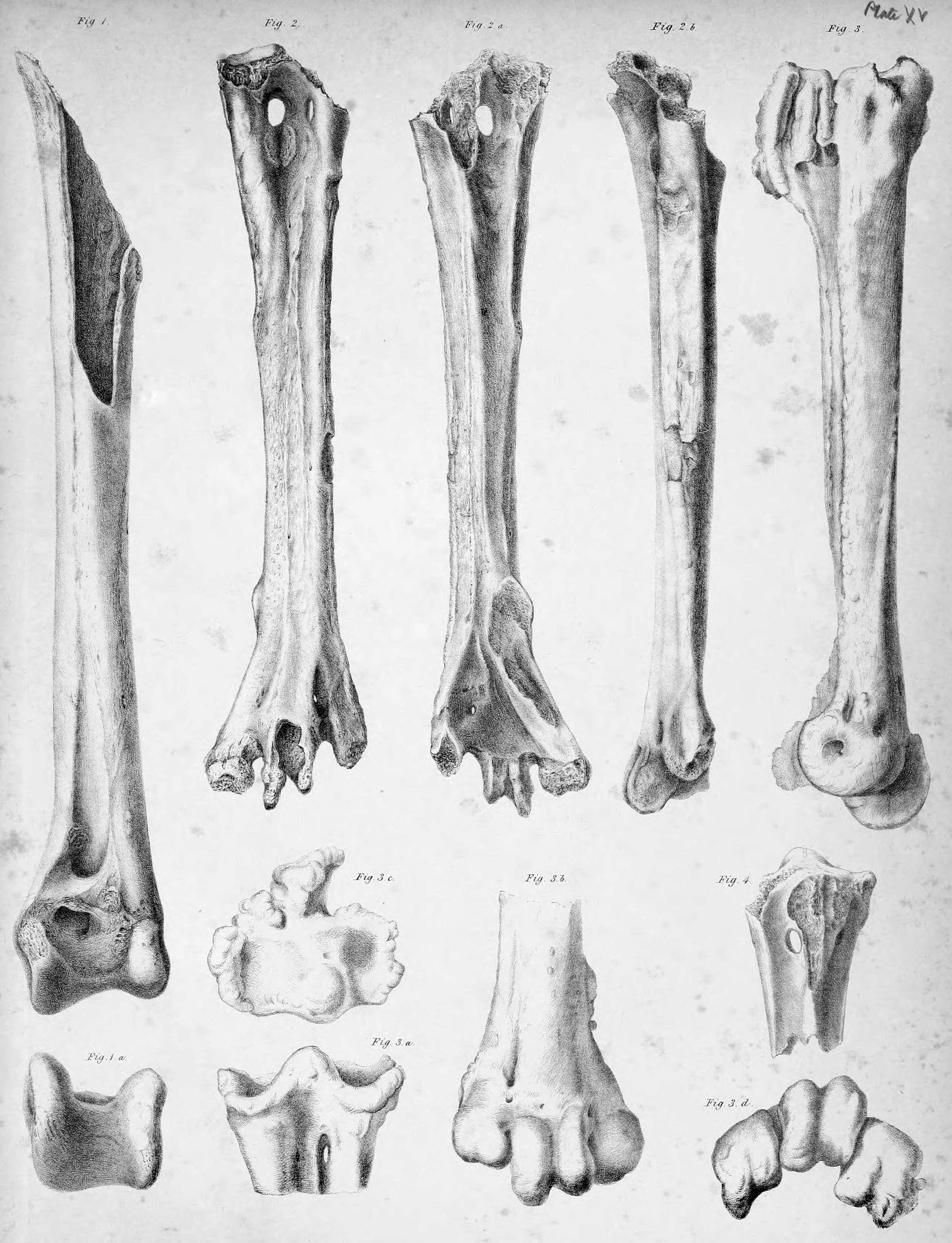
The first stalagmite-encrusted remains of this bird found in 1786 compared to bones found in 1831, which confirmed they belonged to the same, distinct species in 1848

In 1786, subfossil Rodrigues solitaire bones encrusted in stalagmite were discovered in a cave on Rodrigues and sent to the French naturalist Georges Cuvier in about 1830. For unknown reasons, he stated they had recently been found on Mauritius, which caused confusion, until they were compared with other bones found on Rodrigues in 1831 that were shown to belong to the same, distinct species by the English naturalists Hugh Edwin Strickland and Alexander Gordon Melville in 1848. The latter bones were thought lost until they were rediscovered in 1852.

Strickland and Melville suggested the common descent of the Rodrigues solitaire and the dodo in their 1848 monograph about the latter. They dissected the only known dodo specimen with soft tissue, comparing it with the few Rodrigues solitaire remains then available. They stated that, although not identical, these birds shared many distinguishing features in the leg bones otherwise only known in pigeons. The fact that the Rodrigues solitaire laid only one egg, fed on fruits, was monogamous and cared for its nestlings also supported this relationship. Strickland recognised its generic distinction and named the new genus Pezophaps, from ancient Greek pezos (πεζός 'pedestrian') and phaps (φάψ 'pigeon'). The differences between the sexes of the bird were so large that Strickland thought they belonged to two species, naming the smaller female bird Pezophaps minor in 1852.

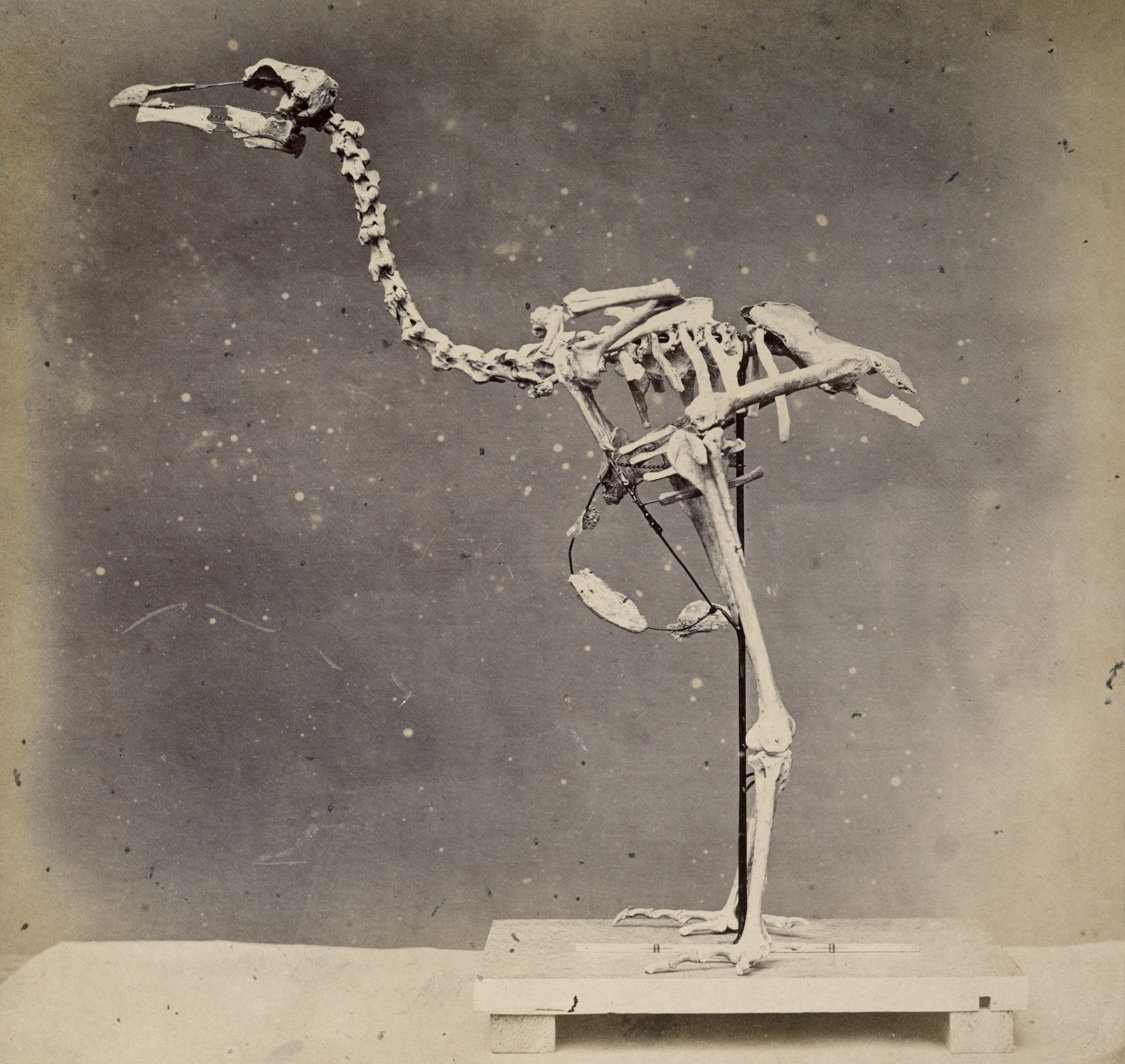
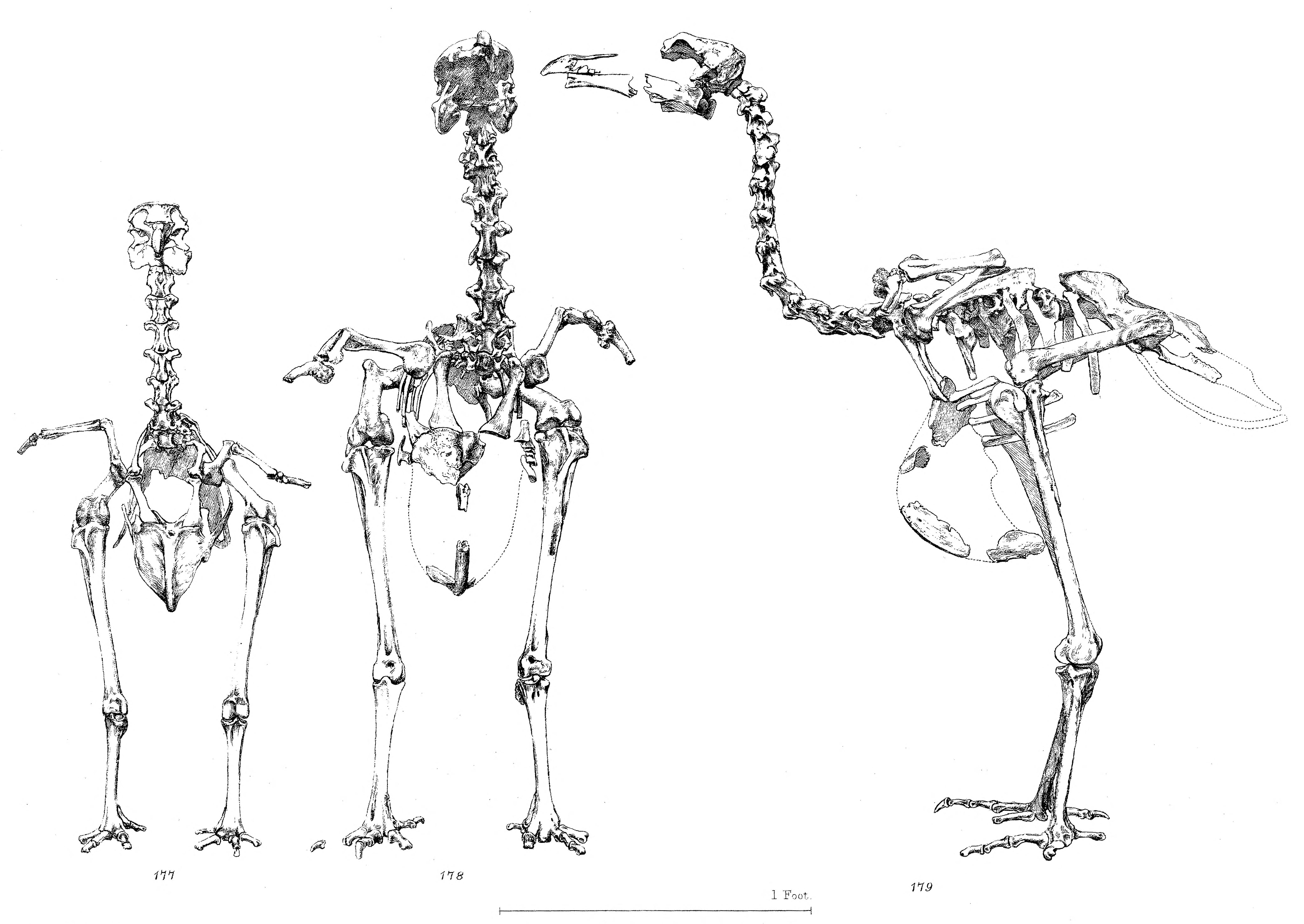
Photo and illustrations (one traced from the photo) showing bones known by 1869

Additional subfossils were recovered during the 1860s, but more complete remains were found during the 1874 transit of Venus, since an observation station was located on the island. Many of these excavations were requested by the English ornithologists (and brothers) Alfred and Edward Newton, who used them to describe the osteology of the bird in detail. Thousands of bones were excavated, and mounted skeletons were composed from the remains of several specimens. Study of skeletal features by the Newtons indicated that the solitaire was morphologically intermediate between the dodo and ordinary pigeons, but differed from them in its unique carpal knob. At one point it was suggested that the skeleton of this species is the best described after that of humans.

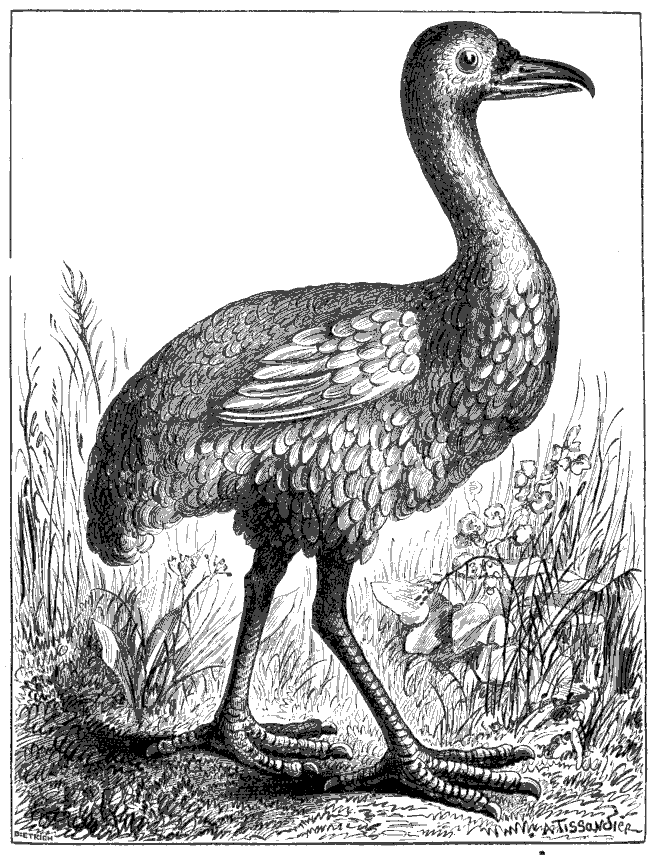
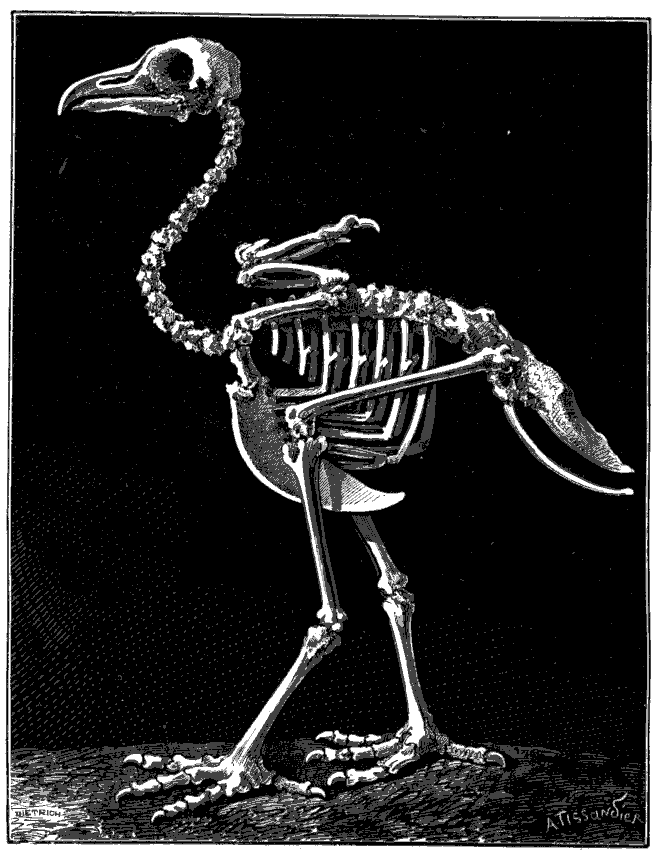
1874 attempts at restoring the Rodrigues solitaire and its skeleton

Some scientists believed that Réunion was home not only to a white dodo, but also to a white bird similar to the Rodrigues solitaire, both of which are now believed to be misinterpretations of old reports of the Réunion ibis. An atypical 17th-century description of a dodo and bones found on Rodrigues, now known to have belonged to the Rodrigues solitaire, led the British taxidermist Abraham Dee Bartlett to name a new species in 1851, Didus nazarenus; it is now a junior synonym of this species.

In spite of the available evidence, some later scholars doubted Leguat's story, and the existence of the Rodrigues solitaire. In 1921, the American linguist Geoffroy Atkinson claimed Leguat's memoir was merely a novel, and that the man had never even existed, and in 1955, the British ecologist George Evelyn Hutchinson doubted aspects of the bird's biology mentioned by Leguat. Today, it is widely accepted that Leguat's memoirs are credible observations of the bird in life.

For many years the dodo and the Rodrigues solitaire were placed in a family of their own, the Raphidae (formerly Dididae), because their exact relationships with other pigeons were unresolved. Each was also placed in a monotypic family (Raphidae and Pezophapidae, respectively), as it was thought that they had evolved their similarities independently. Osteological and DNA analysis has since led to the dissolution of the family Raphidae, and the dodo and solitaire are now placed in the columbid subfamily Raphinae and tribe Raphini, along with their closest relatives. In 2024, the new subtribe Raphina was created to include only the dodo and the solitaire.

=== Evolution ===
In 2002, American geneticist Beth Shapiro and colleagues analysed the DNA of the dodo and the Rodrigues solitaire for the first time. Comparison of mitochondrial cytochrome b and 12S rRNA sequences isolated from the femur of a Rodrigues solitaire and the tarsal of a dodo confirmed their close relationship and their placement within the Columbidae. The genetic evidence was interpreted as showing the Southeast Asian Nicobar pigeon (Caloenas nicobarica) to be their closest living relative, followed by the crowned pigeons (Goura) of New Guinea, and the superficially dodo-like tooth-billed pigeon (Didunculus strigirostris) from Samoa. This clade consists of generally ground-dwelling island endemic pigeons. The following cladogram shows the closest relationships of the dodo and the Rodrigues solitaire within Columbidae, based on Shapiro and colleagues, 2002:

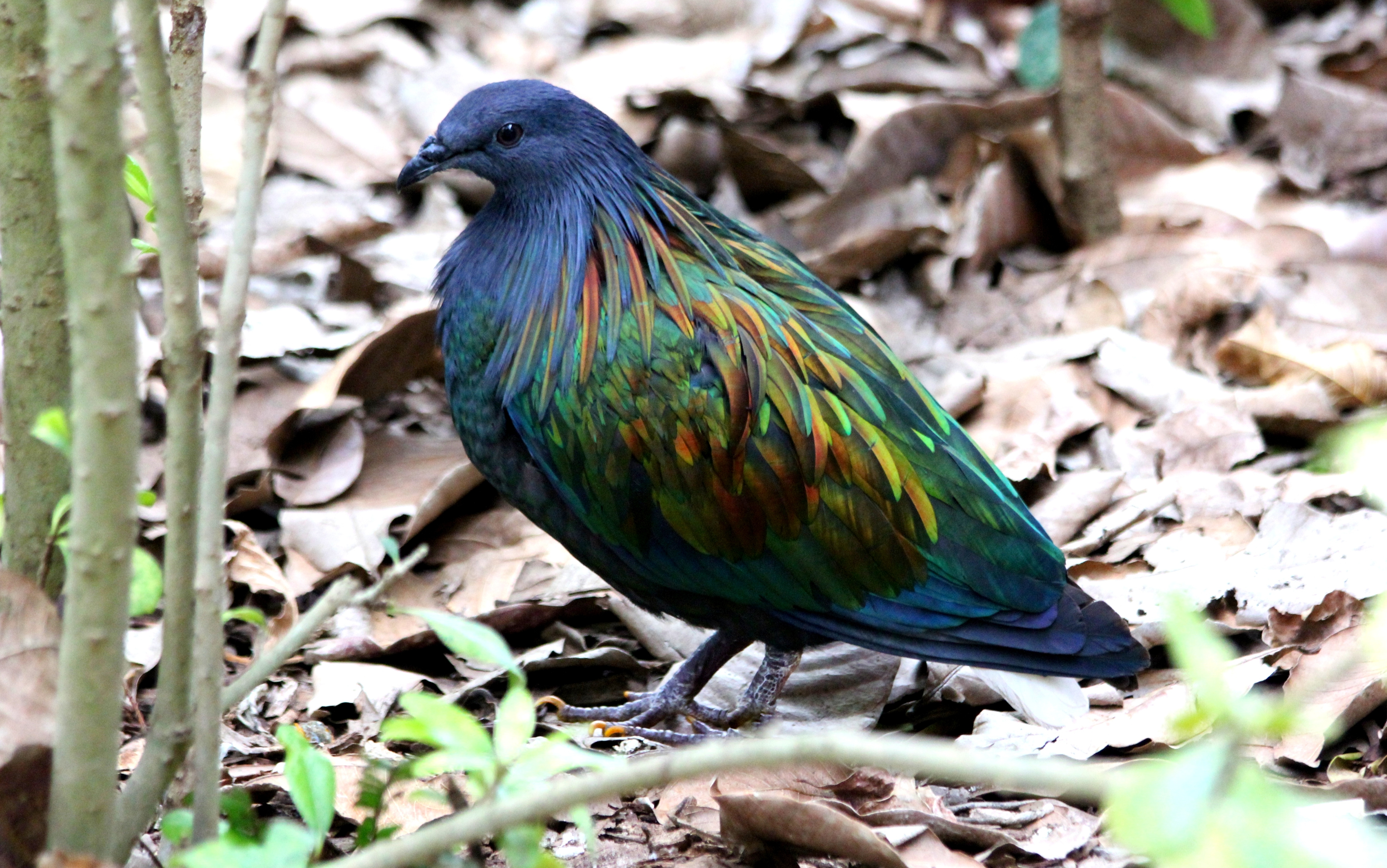
A Nicobar pigeon, the closest living relative of the Rodrigues solitaire and the dodo according to DNA studies

- - Didunculus strigirostris (tooth-billed pigeon)
  - - Goura victoria (Victoria crowned pigeon)
    - - - - Caloenas nicobarica (Nicobar pigeon)
          - - †Pezophaps solitaria (Rodrigues solitaire)
            - †Raphus cucullatus (dodo)

A similar cladogram was published in 2007, inverting the placement of Goura and Didunculus and including the pheasant pigeon (Otidiphaps nobilis) and the thick-billed ground pigeon (Trugon terrestris) at the base of the clade. Based on behavioural and morphological evidence, Jolyon C. Parish proposed that the dodo and Rodrigues solitaire should be placed in the Gourinae subfamily along with the Goura pigeons and others, in agreement with the genetic evidence In 2014, DNA of the only known specimen of the recently extinct spotted green pigeon (Caloenas maculata) was analysed, and it was found to be a close relative of the Nicobar pigeon, and thus also the dodo and Rodrigues solitaire.

The 2002 study indicated that the ancestors of the Rodrigues solitaire and the dodo diverged around the Paleogene–Neogene boundary. The Mascarene Islands (Mauritius, Réunion, and Rodrigues), are of volcanic origin and are less than 10 million years old. Therefore, the ancestors of both birds probably remained capable of flight for a considerable time after the separation of their lineage. The Nicobar and spotted green pigeon were placed at the base of a lineage leading to the Raphinae, which indicates the flightless raphines had ancestors that were able to fly, were semi-terrestrial, and inhabited islands. This in turn supports the hypothesis that the ancestors of those birds reached the Mascarene islands by island hopping from South Asia. The lack of mammalian herbivores competing for resources on these islands allowed the solitaire and the dodo to attain very large sizes. The dodo lost the ability to fly owing to the lack of mammalian predators on Mauritius. Another large, flightless pigeon, the Viti Levu giant pigeon (Natunaornis gigoura), was described in 2001 from subfossil material from Fiji. It was only slightly smaller than the Rodrigues solitaire and the dodo, and it too is thought to have been related to the crowned pigeons.

== Description ==
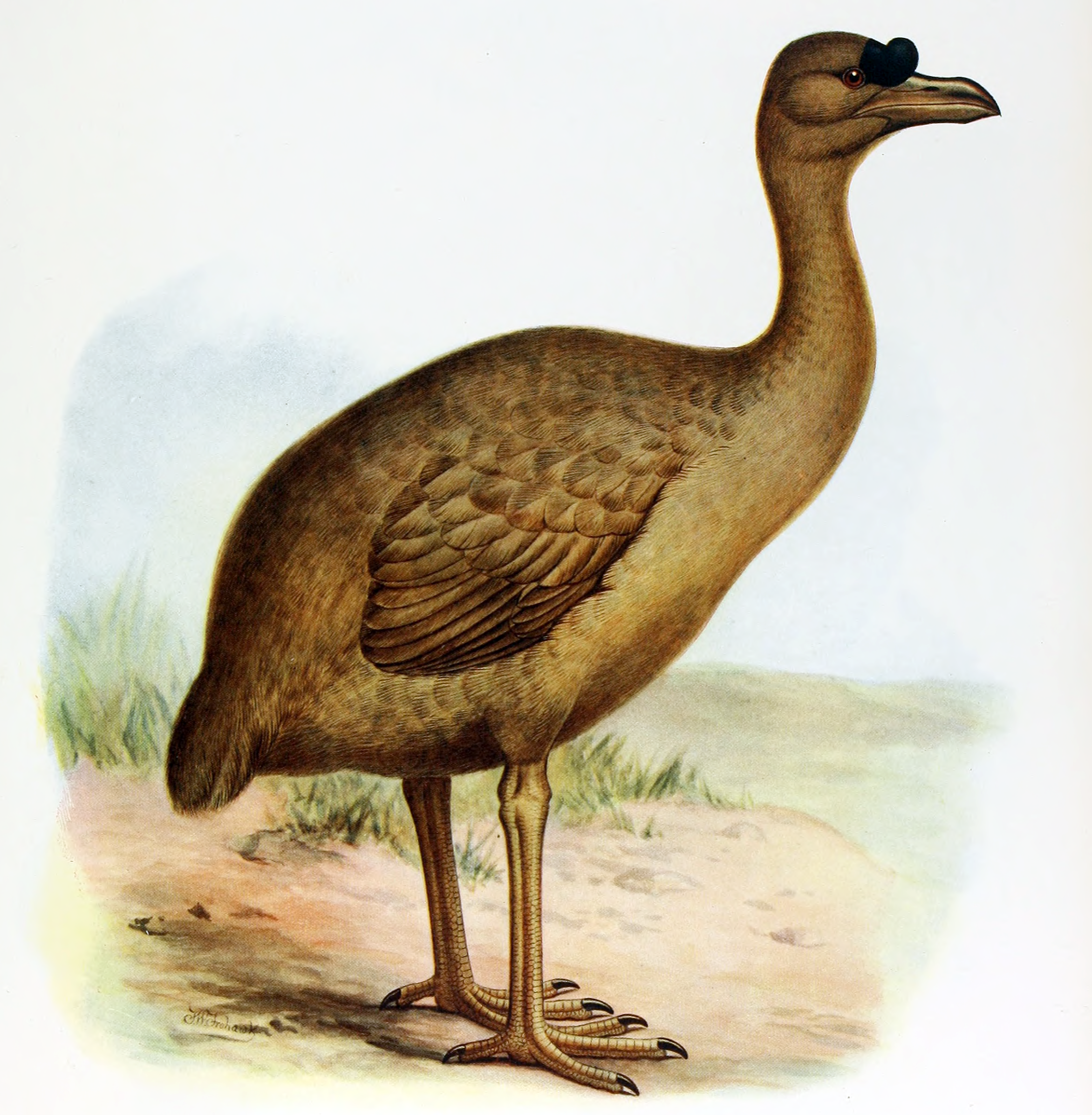
Restoration by Frederick William Frohawk, 1907

The beak of the Rodrigues solitaire was slightly hooked, and its neck and legs were long. One observer described it as the size of a swan. The skull was 170 mm (6.7 in) long, flattened at the top with the fore and hind parts elevated into two bony ridges structured with cancellous bone. A black band (a contemporary description described it as a "frontlet") appeared on its head just behind the base of the beak. The plumage of the Rodrigues solitaire was described as grey and brown. Females were paler than males and had light-coloured elevations on the lower neck.

Sexual size dimorphism in this species is perhaps the greatest in any neognath bird. Males were considerably larger than females, measuring 75.7–90 centimetres (30–35 inches) in height and weighing up to 28 kilograms (62 pounds), whereas females were 63.8–70 centimetres (25–28 in) and weighed up to 17 kilograms (37 lb). This is only 60% of the weight of a mature male. Their weight may have varied substantially due to fat cycles, meaning that individuals were fat during cool seasons, but slim during hot seasons, and may have been as low as 21 kg in males and 13 kg in females. Though male pigeons are usually larger than females, there is no direct evidence for the largest specimens actually being the males of the species, and this has only been assumed based on early works. Though the male was probably largest, this can only be confirmed by molecular sexing techniques, and not skeletal morphology alone.

=== Skeleton ===
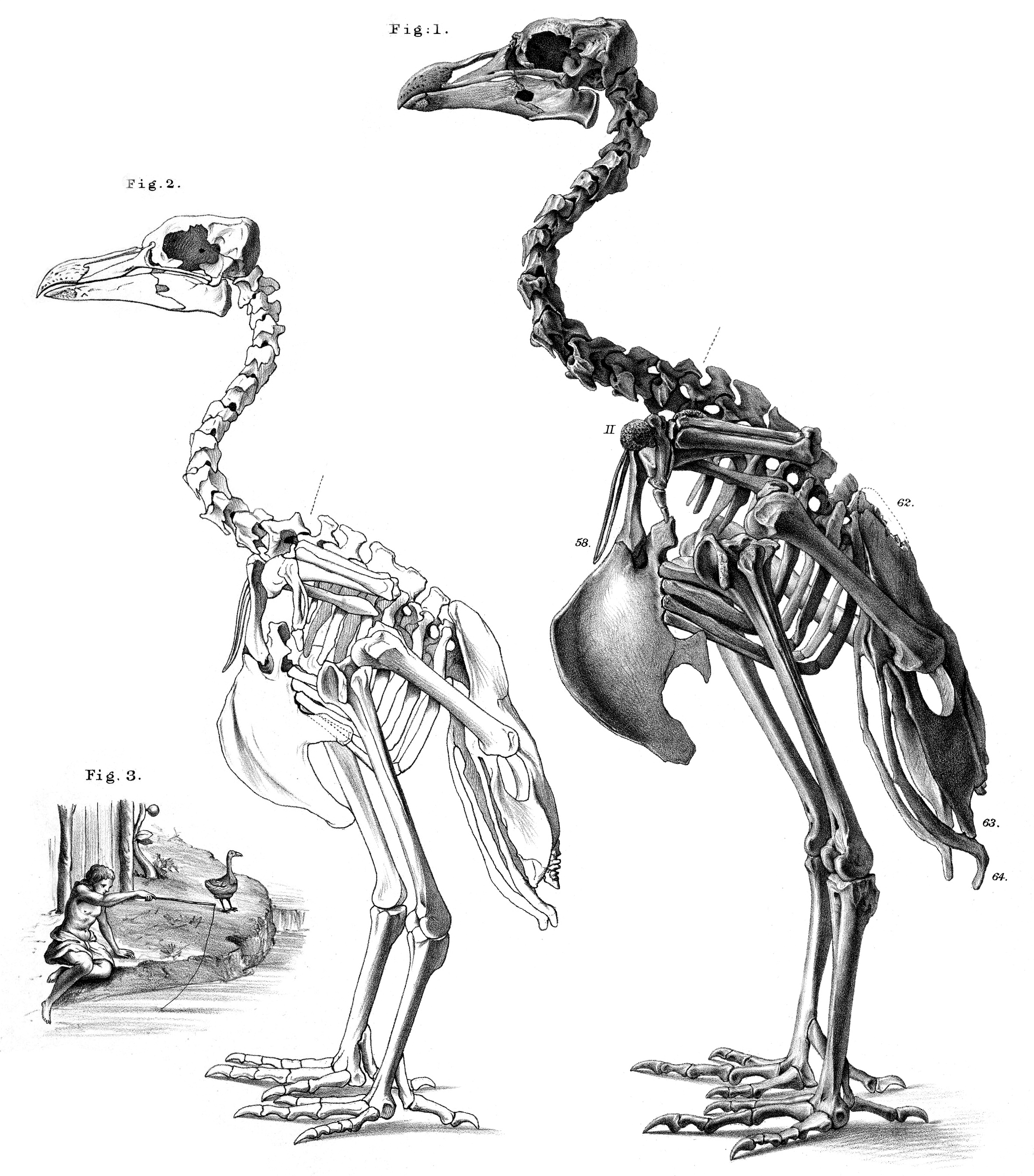
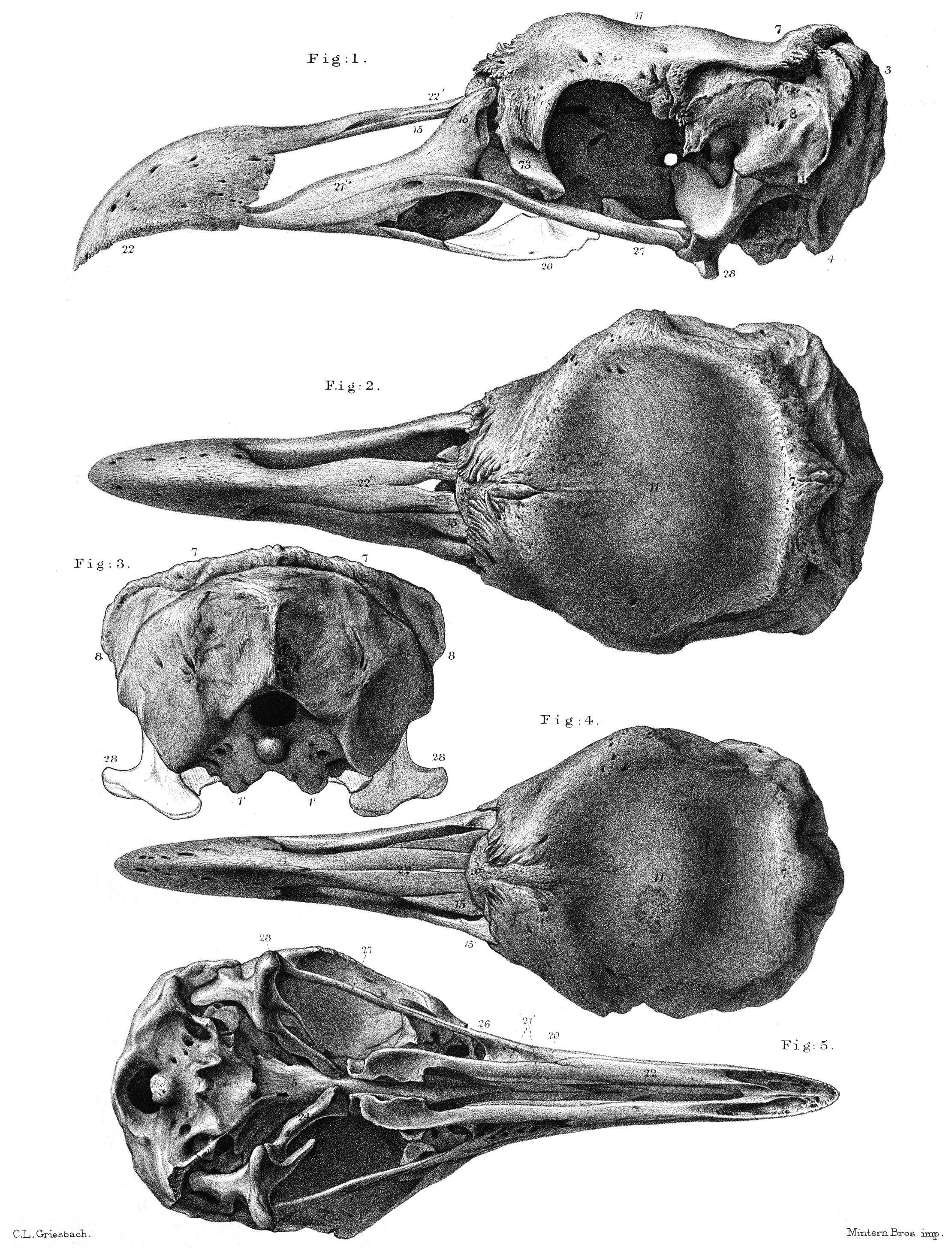
Skeletons of a female and male collected in 1874 (left), and skulls of a male and female in several views

Members of both sexes possessed a large tuberous knob of bone exostosis situated at the base of the carpometacarpus of each wrist. Other wing bones also sometimes show similar structures. The knob was cauliflower-like in appearance, and consisted of up to two or three lobes. The knobs were about half the length of the metacarpus, were larger in males than females, and described as the size of a musket ball. One study measured the largest knob to be 32.9 millimetres (1.30 in) in diameter. The knobs vary in size across individuals, and were entirely absent from 58% of specimens examined for the study. These are thought to be immature birds, or birds without territory.

The carpometacarpi of males without the knobs were smaller on average than those with it, but there was little difference between the females. In life, the knobs would have been covered by tough cartilaginous or keratinous integument, which would have made them appear even larger. Carpal spurs and knobs are also known from other extant as well as extinct birds. Within Columbidae, the crowned pigeons and the Viti Levu giant pigeon have outgrowths on the carpometacarpus which are similar to those of the female Rodrigues solitaire. Other well known examples are the steamer ducks, the torrent duck, sheathbills, screamers, the spur-winged goose, and the extinct Jamaican ibis.

The Rodrigues solitaire shared traits with the dodo, its closest relative, such as size and features in the skull, pelvis, and sternum. It differed in other aspects; it was taller and more slender than the dodo and had a smaller skull and beak, a flatter skull roof, and larger orbits. Its neck and legs were proportionally longer, and the dodo did not possess an equivalent to the carpal knob of the Rodrigues solitaire. Many skeletal features of the Rodrigues solitaire and dodo that are unique among pigeons have evolved to adapt to flightlessness. Their pelvic elements were thicker than those of flighted birds (to support their greater weight), and their pectoral region and wings were paedomorphic (underdeveloped, retaining juvenile features). However, the skull, trunk, and pelvic limbs were peramorphic, which means they changed considerably with maturity.

=== Contemporary descriptions ===
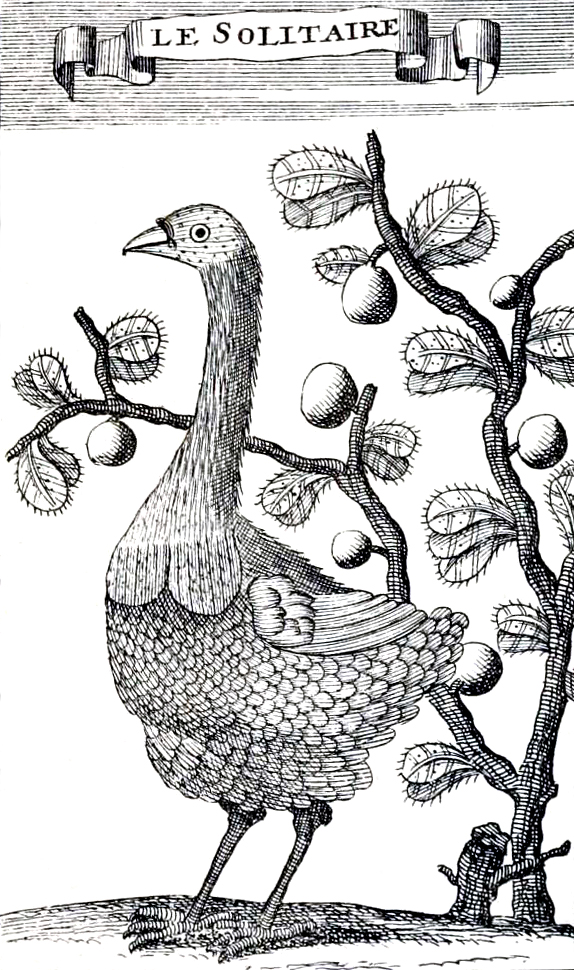
1708 drawing by François Leguat, the only known illustration of this species by someone who observed it alive

Apart from Leguat's rather simple depiction, the life appearance of the Rodrigues solitaire is only known from a handful of descriptions; no soft-tissue remains survive. Leguat devoted three pages of his memoirs to the Rodrigues solitaire, and was clearly impressed by the bird. He described its appearance as follows:

Of all the Birds in the Island the most remarkable is that which goes by the name of the solitary, because it is very seldom seen in company, tho' there are abundance of them. The Feathers of the Males are of a brown grey Colour: the Feet and Beak are like a Turkey's, but a little more crooked. They have scarce any Tail, but their Hind-part covered with Feathers is roundish, like the Crupper [rump] of a horse; they are taller than Turkeys. Their Neck is straight, and a little longer in proportion than a Turkey's when it lifts up his Head. Its Eye is Black and lively, and its Head without Comb or Cop. They never fly, their Wings are too little to support the Weight of their Bodies; they serve only to beat themselves, and flutter when they call one another. They will whirl about for twenty or thirty times together on the same side, during the space of four or five minutes. The motion of their Wings makes then a noise very like that of a Rattle; and one may hear it two hundred Paces off. The Bone of their Wing grows greater towards the Extremity, and forms a little round Mass under the Feathers, as big as a Musket Ball. That and its Beak are the chief Defence of this Bird. 'Tis very hard to catch it in the Woods, but easie in open Places, because we run faster than they, and sometimes we approach them without much Trouble. From March to September they are extremely fat, and taste admirably well, especially while they are young, some of the Males weigh forty-five Pounds.

Several of Leguat's observations were later confirmed through study of subfossil Rodrigues solitaire remains. The curved contour lines of the pelvis also support the roundness of its hind parts, which he compared to that of a horse. Also, a ridged surface appears at the base of the beak, indicating the position of the caruncular ridge, which Leguat described as a "widow's peak". Before fossils of the carpal knob were found, Strickland noted that the keel of the sternum of the Rodrigues solitaire was so well-developed as to almost indicate it had possessed the power of flight; however, since the humerus was very short he inferred that this was instead related to Leguat's claim that they used their wings for defence.

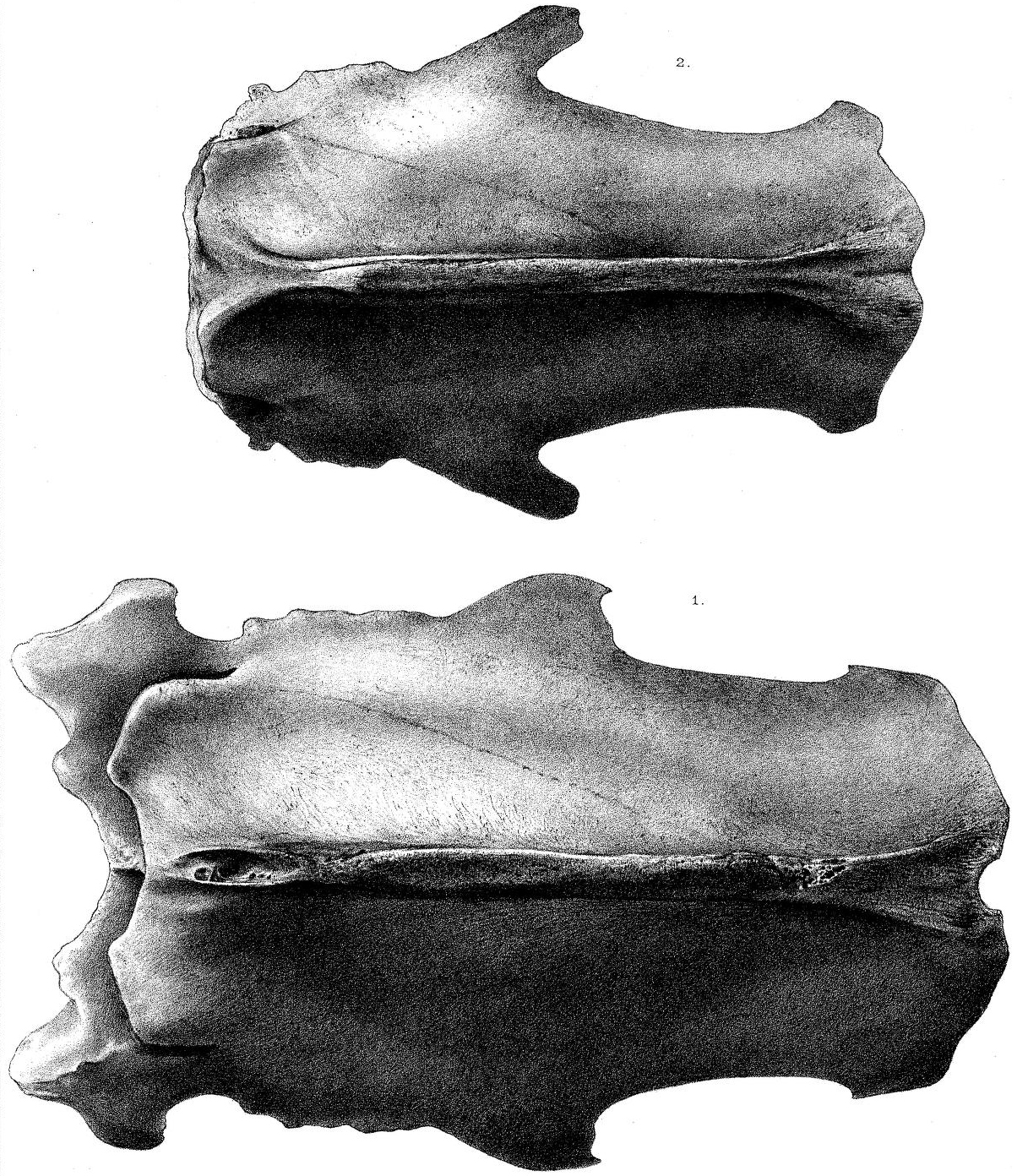
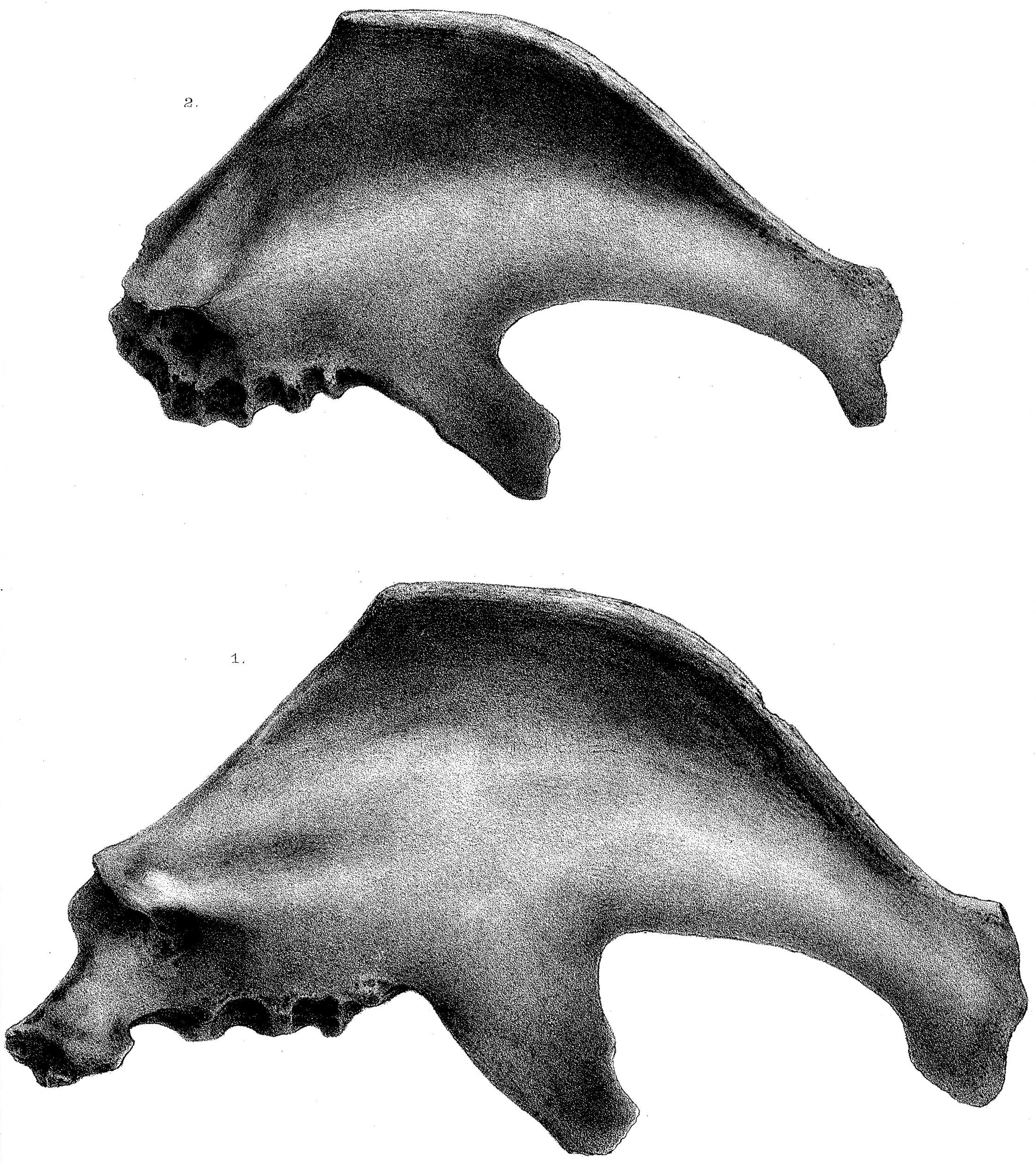
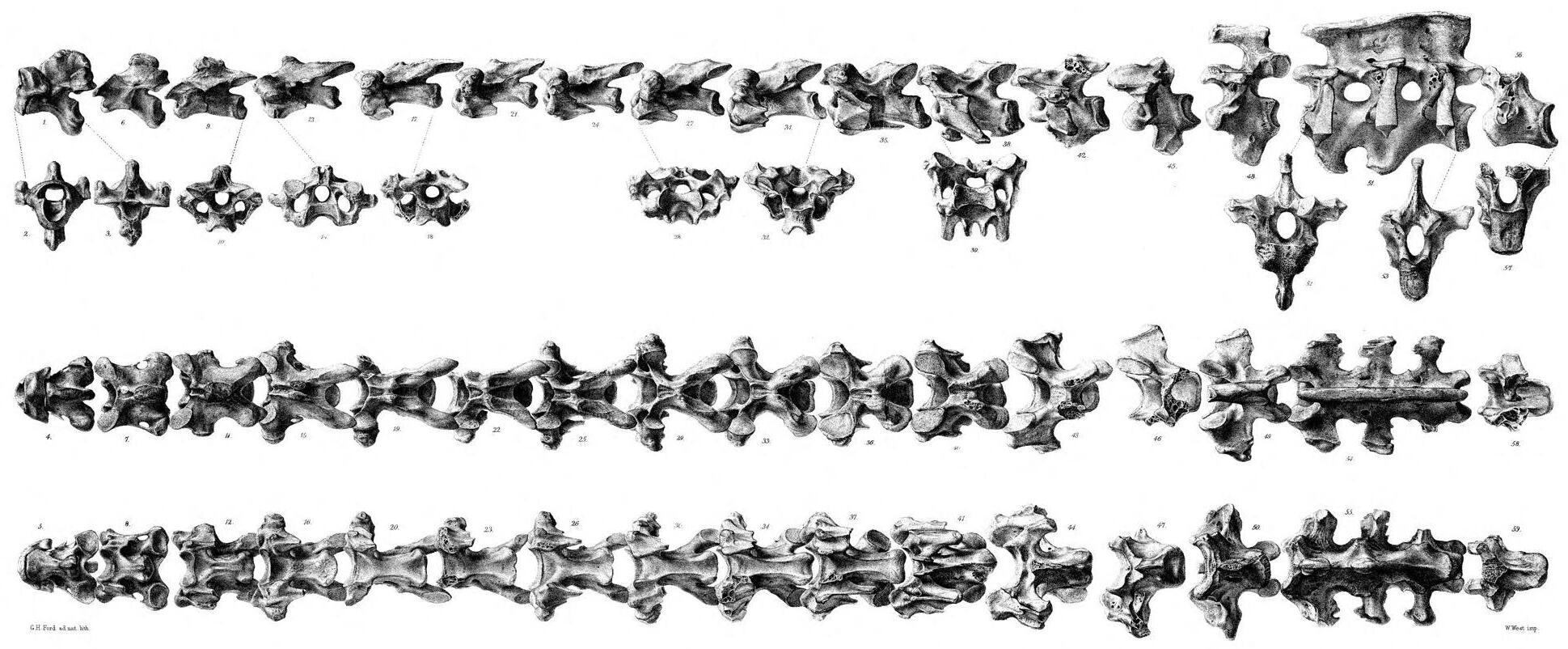
Sterna of a female (smaller) and male from below and the side (upper left and right), and vertebrae

Leguat continued with an elaborate description of the female Rodrigues solitaire, which also appears to be the sex depicted in his illustration of the bird:

The Females are wonderfully beautiful, some fair, some brown; I call them fair, because they are the colour of fair Hair. They have a sort of Peak, like a Widow's upon their Breasts [beaks], which is of a dun colour. No one Feather is straggling from the other all over their Bodies, they being very careful to adjust themselves, and make them all even with their Beaks. The Feathers on their Thighs are round like Shells at the end, and being there very thick, have an agreeable effect. They have two Risings on their Craws [crop] and the Feathers are whiter than the rest, which livelily represents the fine neck of a Beautiful Woman. They walk with so much Stateliness and good Grace, that one cannot help admiring them and loving them; by which means their fine Mein often saves their Lives.

It has been proposed that Leguat's comparison between the crop of the female Rodrigues solitaire and the "beautiful bosom of a woman" (changed to "fine neck" in some editions of his memoirs) was out of longing for female companionship.

Leguat's statements were confirmed by another description by Julien Tafforet, who wrote in 1726:

The solitaire is a large bird, which weighs about forty or fifty pounds. They have a very big head, with a sort of frontlet, as if of black velvet. Their feathers are neither feathers nor fur; they are of light grey colour, with a little black on their backs. Strutting proudly about, either alone or in pairs, they preen their plumage or fur with their beak, and keep themselves very clean. They have their toes furnished with hard scales, and run with quickness, mostly among the rocks, where a man, however agile, can hardly catch them. They have a very short beak, of about an inch in length, which is sharp. They, nevertheless, do not attempt to hurt anyone, except when they find someone before them, and, when hardly pressed, try to bite him. They have a small stump of a wing, which has a sort of bullet at its extremity, and serves as a defence.

== Behaviour and ecology ==
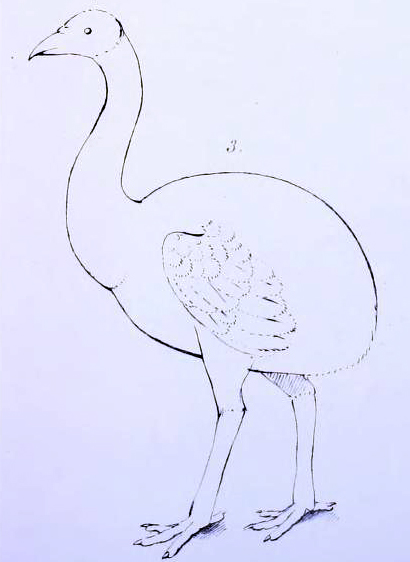
1854 restoration by Hermann Schlegel

Some evidence, including their large size and the fact that tropical and frugivorous birds have slower growth rates, indicates that the Rodrigues solitaire may have had a protracted development period. Based on mass estimates, the American ornithologist Bradley C. Livezey suggested in 1993 the male could reach the age of 28, and the female 17. The French economist Pierre-André d'Héguerty, writing about his time on the island around 1735, stated that a captive Rodrigues solitaire (which he described as having a melancholic appearance) would always walk in the same line until running out of space, and then return. The species may have lived primarily in the island's woodlands, rather than on the shores.

Many other of the endemic species of Rodrigues became extinct after the arrival of humans, so the ecosystem of the island is heavily damaged. Before humans arrived, forests covered the island entirely, but very little remains today due to deforestation. The Rodrigues solitaire lived alongside other recently extinct birds such as the Rodrigues rail, the Rodrigues parrot, Newton's parakeet, the Rodrigues starling, the Rodrigues scops owl, the Rodrigues night heron, and the Rodrigues pigeon. Extinct reptiles include the domed Rodrigues giant tortoise, the saddle-backed Rodrigues giant tortoise, and the Rodrigues day gecko.

=== Diet ===
Leguat stated that the Rodrigues solitaire fed on dates, whereas Tafforet mentioned seeds and leaves. No other accounts mention diet. It has been suggested it ate latan palm fruits, for which it competed with the now extinct Cylindraspis tortoises. It is not known how the young were fed, but related pigeons provide crop milk. The risings on the crop of the female may have covered glands that produced the crop milk. If the theory is correct, the birds may have practiced a division of labour, where the female stayed and fed the young crop milk, while the male collected food in the crop and delivered it to the female. The American ornithologist Robert W. Storer suggested in 2005 that the maximum size attained by the solitaire and the dodo was limited by the amount of crop milk they were able to produce for their young during early growth.

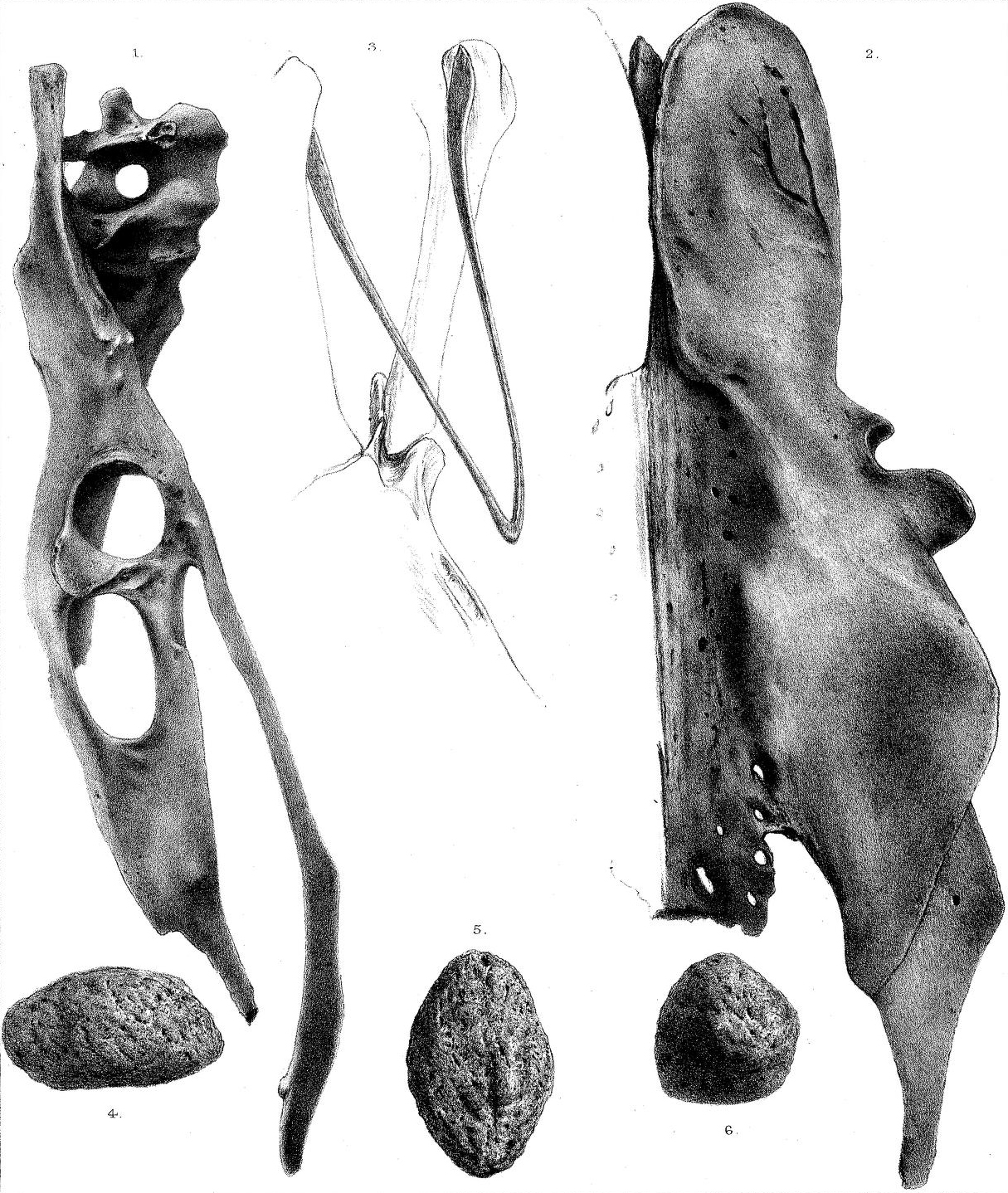
Pelvis of a female (1) and male (2), furcula (3) and gizzard stone (4–6)

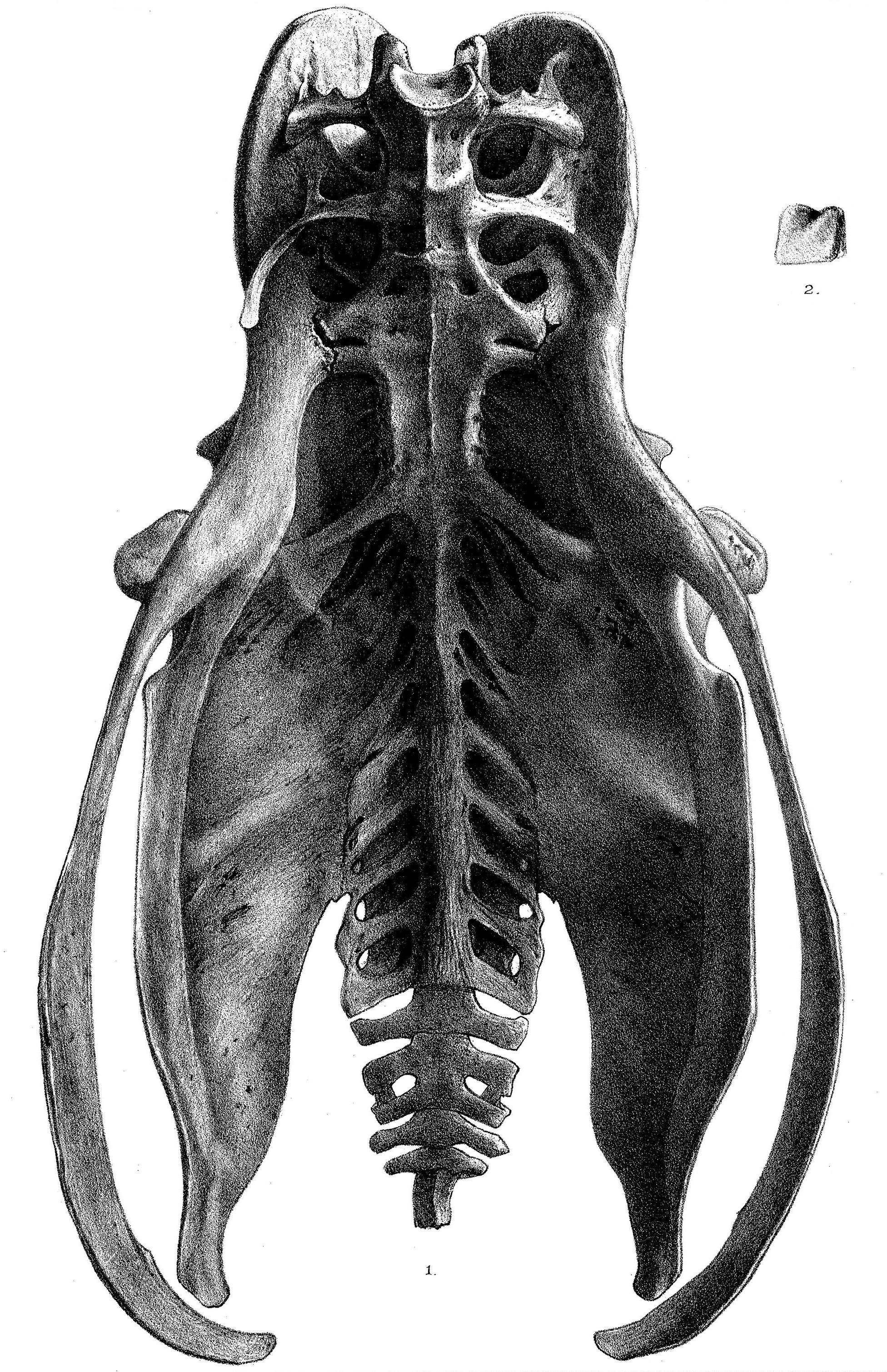
Male pelvis from below and coccyx

Several contemporary accounts state that the Rodrigues solitaire used gizzard stones. Dodos also did this, which may imply a similar diet. Leguat described the stones in the following passage, mentioning that Rodrigues solitaires refused to feed in captivity:

Tho' these Birds will sometimes very familiarly come up near enough to one, when we do not run after them, yet they will never grow Tame. As soon as they are caught they shed Tears without Crying, and refuse all sustenance till they die. We find in the Gizzards of both Male and Female, a brown Stone, of the bigness of a Hen's Egg, 'tis somewhat rough, flat on one side and round on the other, heavy and hard. We believe this Stone was there when they were hatched, for let them be never so young, you meet with it always. They never have but one of 'em, and besides, the Passage from the Craw to the Gizard is so narrow, that a like Mass of half Bigness cou'd not pass. It serv'd to whet our Knives better than any other Stone Whatsoever.

In 1877 three stones were found in a cavern on Rodrigues, each near a Rodrigues solitaire skeleton, and were inferred to be the gizzard stones mentioned by Leguat. One of the stones was examined and found to be dolerite: somewhat rough, hard and heavy, c. 50 g (1 3/4 oz), but hardly flat on one side as described by Leguat. This could be due to its association with a young individual. Although Leguat asserted that the bird hatched with the gizzard stone already inside, in reality adults most likely fed the stones to their hatchlings.

=== Territoriality ===
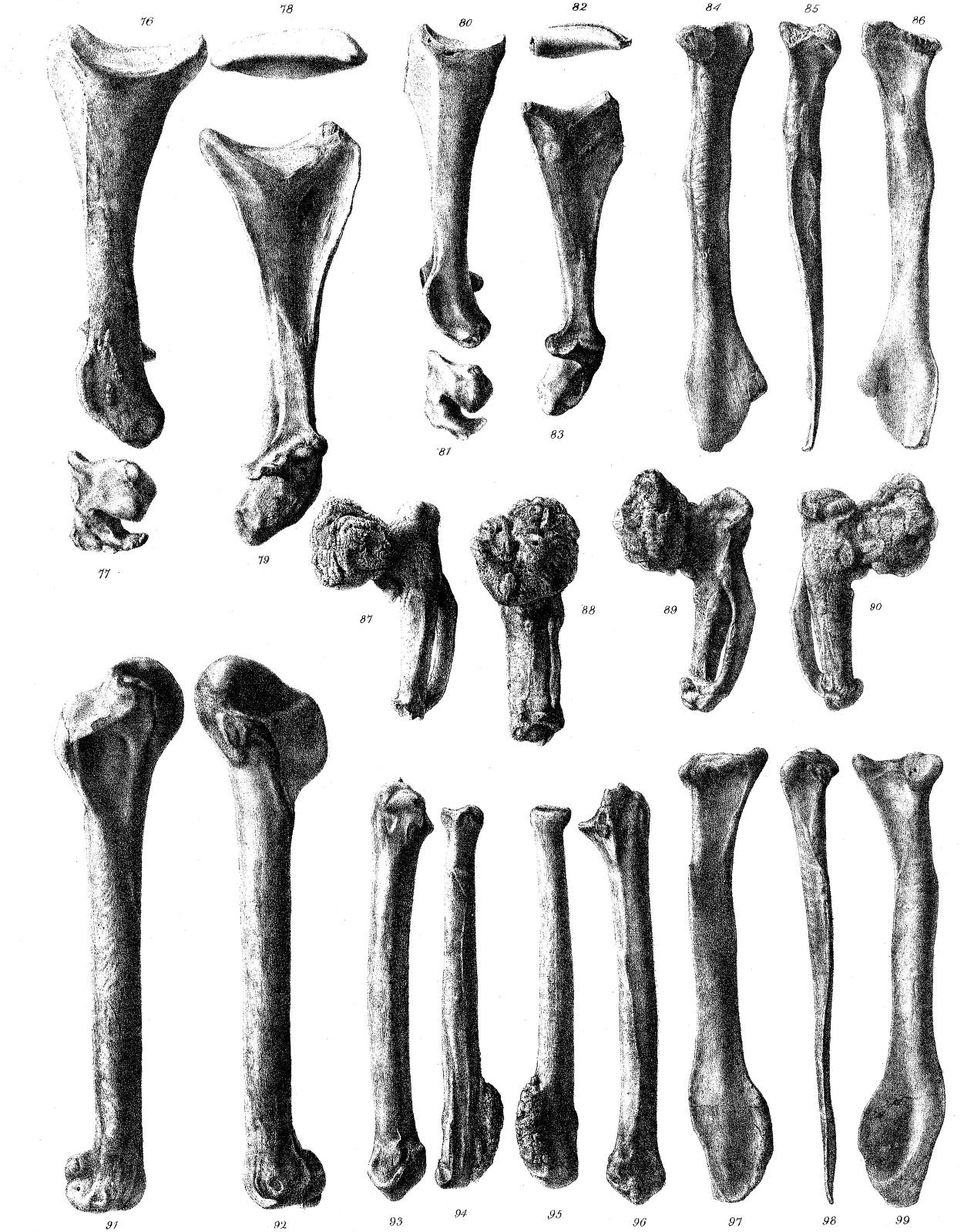
Wing bones, including carpal knobs (87–90) in the middle right

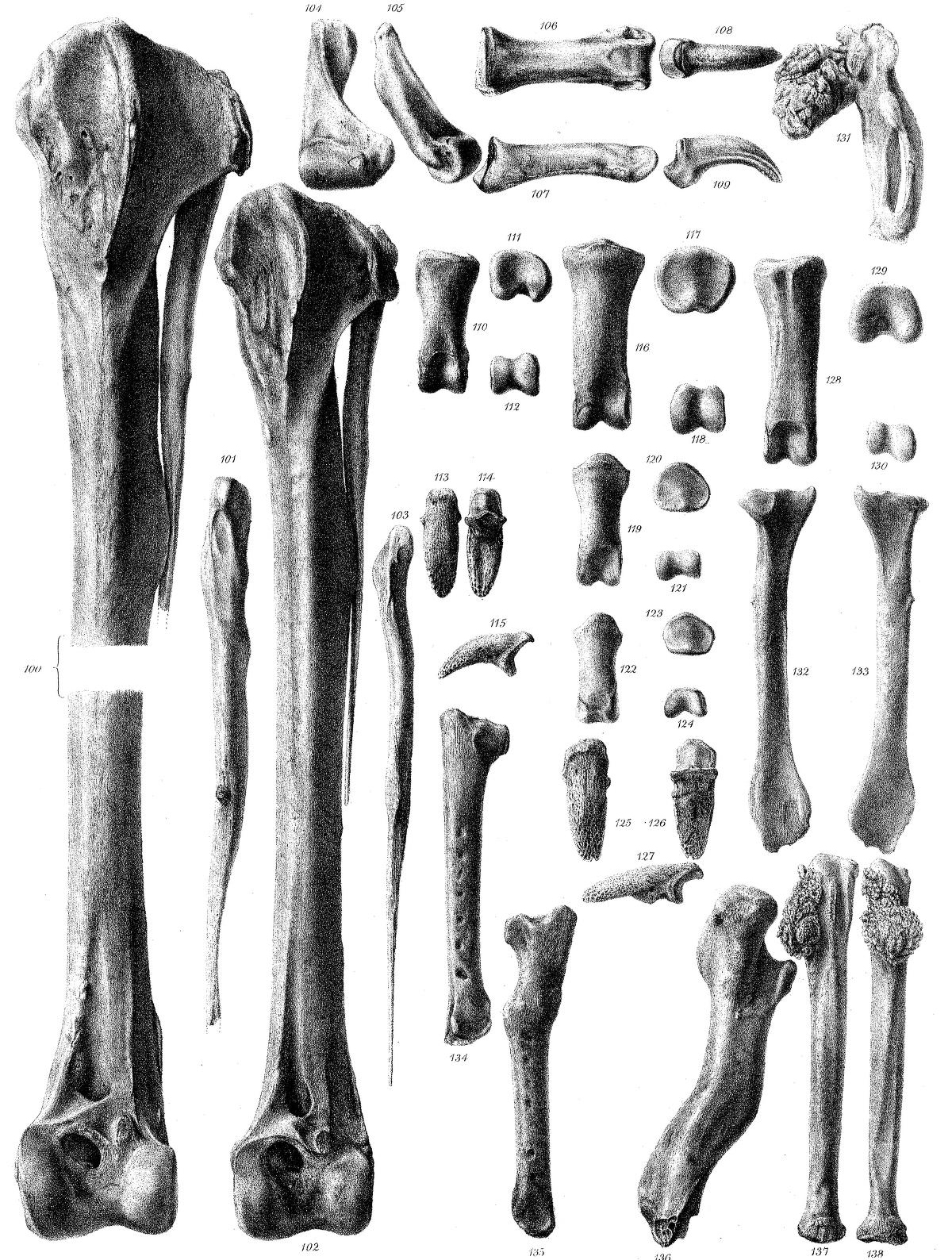
Limb bones, two with healed fractures (135–136) lower right

Observations of the Rodrigues solitaire in life indicate that they were highly territorial. They presumably settled disputes by striking each other with their wings; to aid this purpose, they used the knobs on their wrists. Fractures in their wing bones also indicate that they were used in combat. The American ornithologist Dean Amadon suggested in 1951 that these fractures may have been the result of a hereditary bone disease rather than battle-injuries. The British palaeontologists Julian P. Hume and Lorna Steel pointed out in 2013 that in all extant birds where carpal spurs and knobs are present, these are used as weapons without exceptions. Though some dodo bones have been found with healed fractures, it had weak pectoral muscles and more reduced wings in comparison with the Rodrigues solitaire. Since Rodrigues receives less rainfall and has more seasonal variation than Mauritius, which would have affected the availability of resources on the island, the Rodrigues solitaire would have more reason to evolve aggressive territorial behaviour. Several accounts state that they also defended themselves with a powerful bite.

In addition to their use as weapons, both sexes of the Rodrigues solitaire also used their wings for communication. The wings could create low-frequency sounds for communicating with mates, or to warn rivals, but it is unknown exactly how this sound was created. The sound could be heard 200 yards (182 m) away, and this may therefore be the size of the territory of an individual. Other species of birds (e.g., club-winged manakin) are also known to use their wings to create sounds that attract mates or mark their territory.

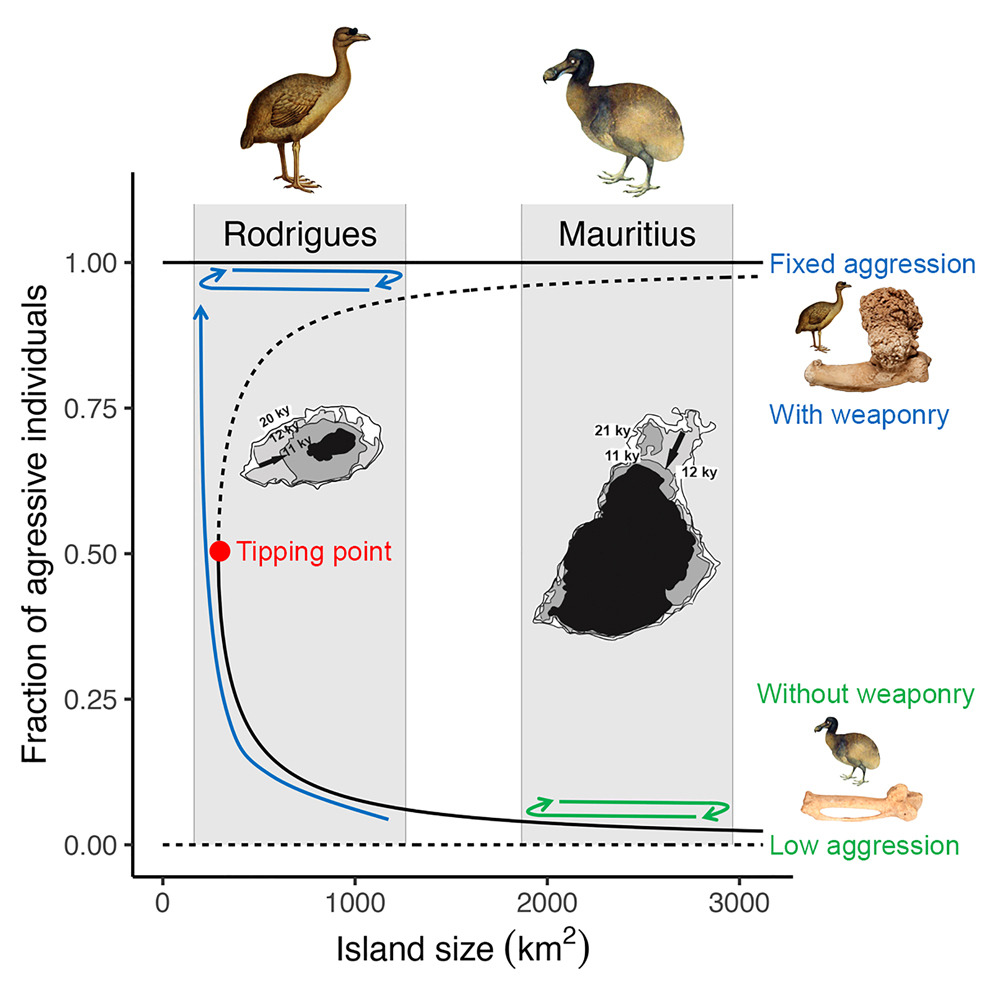
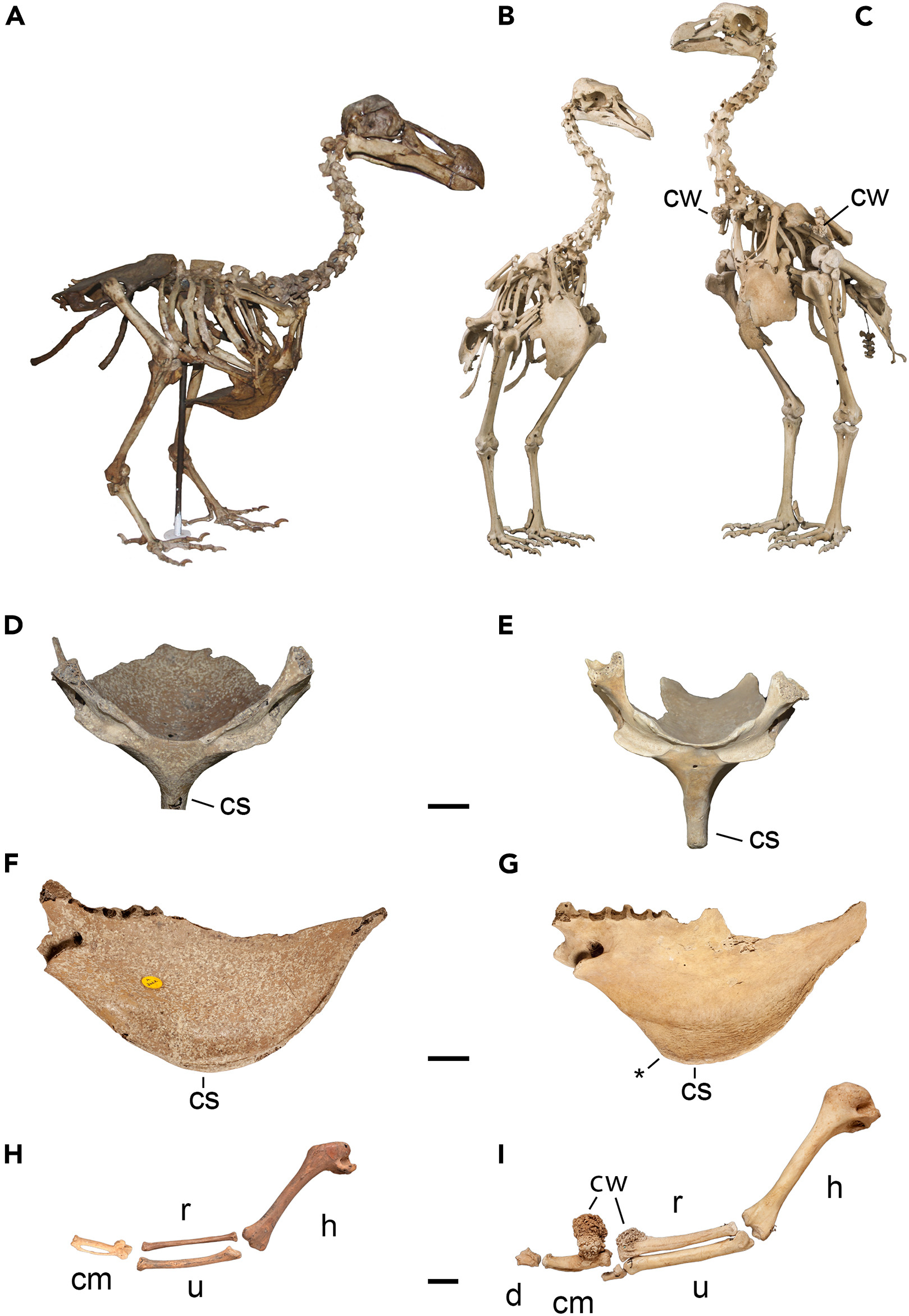
Correlation between aggressive behaviour and decreasing island size in the Rodrigues solitaire (left) and comparison with the dodo, according to a 2024 study

In 1869, the Newton brothers suggested that the carpal knobs may have been formed through continuous injuries, as they resemble diseased bone. It has also been claimed that the carpal knobs were instead formed due to a hereditary disease caused by inbreeding. This was dismissed by Hume and Steel in 2013, since such lesions would likely not occur only in a specific part of the skeleton, but would appear in any growing bone tissue. If such a disease was due to inbreeding, it would also be present in other isolated island bird populations, but it is not. The authors instead suggested that the wing bones contained metaplastic tissue able to form the knob. This development was either in response to continuous impacts during combat, or to hormones released when individuals paired up and acquired territories. It appears a male which had long held a territory would possess especially large carpal knobs, and that their mates would have such developments as well, only smaller.

In 2024, the Dutch biologist Kenneth F. Rijsdijk and colleagues examined why the Rodrigues solitaire and the related dodo differed in their level of aggressive behaviour; while the solitaire was aggressive, the dodo's behavior conformed with the idea that island species develop island tameness. This despite the two being sister species that lived on neighbouring islands, about 600 km (370 mi) apart. They compared the change of island size due to sea level changes with population dynamics by using the Hawk-Dove game model, and concluded that a rapid decrease in island size, as was the case with the much smaller Rodrigues, triggered the onset of aggressive behaviour, due to the resulting competition for the limited resources there.

=== Reproduction ===
The most detailed account of the reproductive habits of the Rodrigues solitaire is Leguat's. He described mating and nesting as follows:

When these Birds build their Nests, they choose a clean Place, gather together some Palm-Leaves for that purpose, and heap them up a foot and a half high from the Ground, on which they sit. They never lay but one Egg, which is much bigger than that of a Goose. The Male and Female both cover it in their turns, and the young is not hatch'd till at seven Weeks' end: All the while they are sitting upon it, or are bringing up their young one, which is not able to provide itself in several Months, they will not suffer any other Bird of their Species to come within two hundred Yards round of the Place; But what is very singular, is, the Males will never drive away the Females, only when he perceives one he makes a noise with his Wings to call to the Female, and she drives the unwelcome Stranger away, not leaving it till 'tis without her Bounds. The Female do's the same as to the Males, whom she leaves to the Male, and he drives them away. We have observ'd this several Times, and I affirm it to be true. The Combats between them on this occasion last sometimes pretty long, because the Stranger only turns about, and do's not fly directly from the Nest. However, the others do not forsake it till they have quite driven it out of their Limits. After these Birds have rais'd their young One, and left it to itself, they are always together, which the other Birds are not, and tho' they happen to mingle with other Birds of the same Species, these two Companions never disunite. We have often remark'd, that some Days after the young leaves the Nest, a Company of thirty or forty brings another young one to it, and the now fledg'd Bird, with its Father and Mother joyning with the Band, march to some bye Place. We frequently follow'd them, and found that afterwards the old ones went each their way alone, or in Couples, and left the two young ones together, which we call'd a Marriage.

The clutch was described as consisting of a single egg; given the bird's large size, this led to proposals that the solitaire was K-selected, which means it produced a low number of altricial offspring, which required extensive parental care until maturity. The gathering of unrelated juveniles suggests that they formed crèches, which may have followed foraging adults as part of the learning process. A study of subfossil remains found that the carpal knob only developed after the bird reached skeletal maturity.

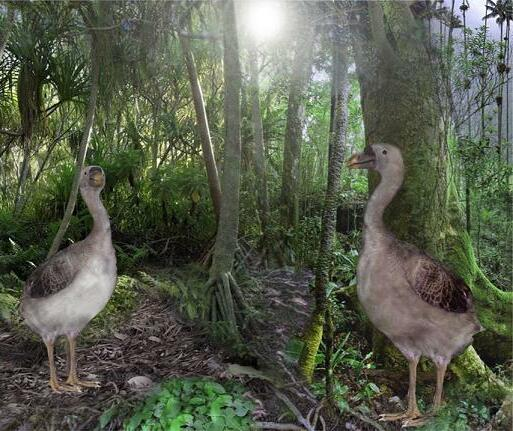
Photo collage restoration of a nesting female and a male in their environment

Tafforet's account confirms Leguat's description of reproductive behaviour, adding that Rodrigues solitaires would even attack humans approaching their chicks:

They do not fly at all, having no feathers to their wings, but they flap them, and make a great noise with their wings when angry, and the noise is something like thunder in the distance. They only ly, as I am led to suppose, but once in the year, and only one egg. Not that I have seen their eggs, for I have not been able to discover where they lay. But I have never seen but one little one alone with them, and, if any one tried to approach it, they would bite him very severely. These birds live on seeds and leaves of trees, which they pick up on the ground. They have a gizzard larger than the fist, and what is surprising is that there is found in it a stone of the size of a henn's egg, of oval shape, a little flattened, although this animal cannot swallow anything larger than a small cherry-stone. I have eaten them: they are tolerably well tasted.

The size difference between sexes has led to the suggestion that the Rodrigues solitaire was not monogamous as stated by Leguat, and that this deeply religious man attributed the trait to the bird for moral reasons. Livezy proposed in 1993 that it was instead polygynous, and the wing-rattling behaviour described for males suggests lek-mating, where males gather for competitive mating display. However, size dimorphism does occur in some monogamous birds; most other pigeons are monogamous as well. A 2015 article by the Norwegian zoologist Ingvar Byrkjedal and colleagues proposed that males invited females into their territories as secondary mates, which would result in the resident female acting aggressively towards the newcomer. Similar behaviour is seen in species that practice resource-defence polygyny. The territories probably provided all the food the birds needed in addition to acting as breeding-areas, and there was probably intense competition for favourable territories. The fact that Rodrigues island shrank by 90% at the end of the Pleistocene may also have contributed to such competition over territories, and thereby furthered sexual dimorphism.

=== Senses ===
In 2016, the first 3D endocast was made from the brain of the dodo and compared to the brains of modern pigeons and the Rodrigues solitaire. This study found that though their brains were similar to those of other pigeons in most respects, the dodo and solitaire had comparatively large olfactory bulbs, giving them a good sense of smell, which may have aided in locating fruit and small prey.

Brain endocasts of the dodo and Rodrigues solitaire were examined by another team in 2026 to estimate their sensory abilities. While this study found that the solitaire was largely a scaled-up pigeon in this regard (including in its olfactory bulbs, unlike the 2016 study), the dodo had developed enhancements in its visual, olfactory and somatosensory systems. The authors of this study speculated that the solitaire did not evolve similar changes to its visual abilities because the harsher conditions of Rodrigues placed different selective pressures on it or because the diets of these species differed. The dodo and solitaire shared better hearing in low frequencies, possibly because their larger size resulted in low-frequency vocalisation (confirmed for the latter by historical accounts).

== Relationship with humans ==
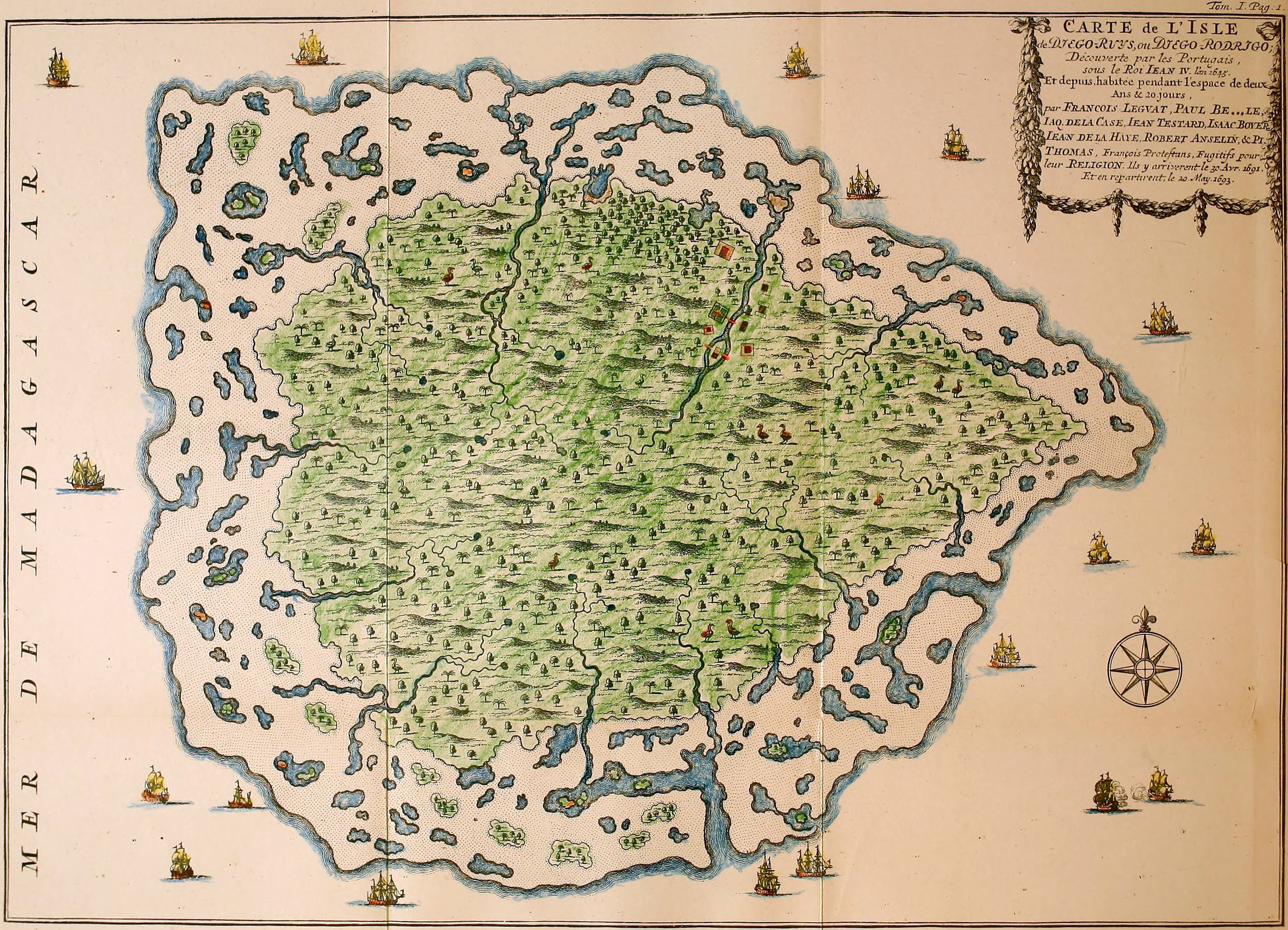
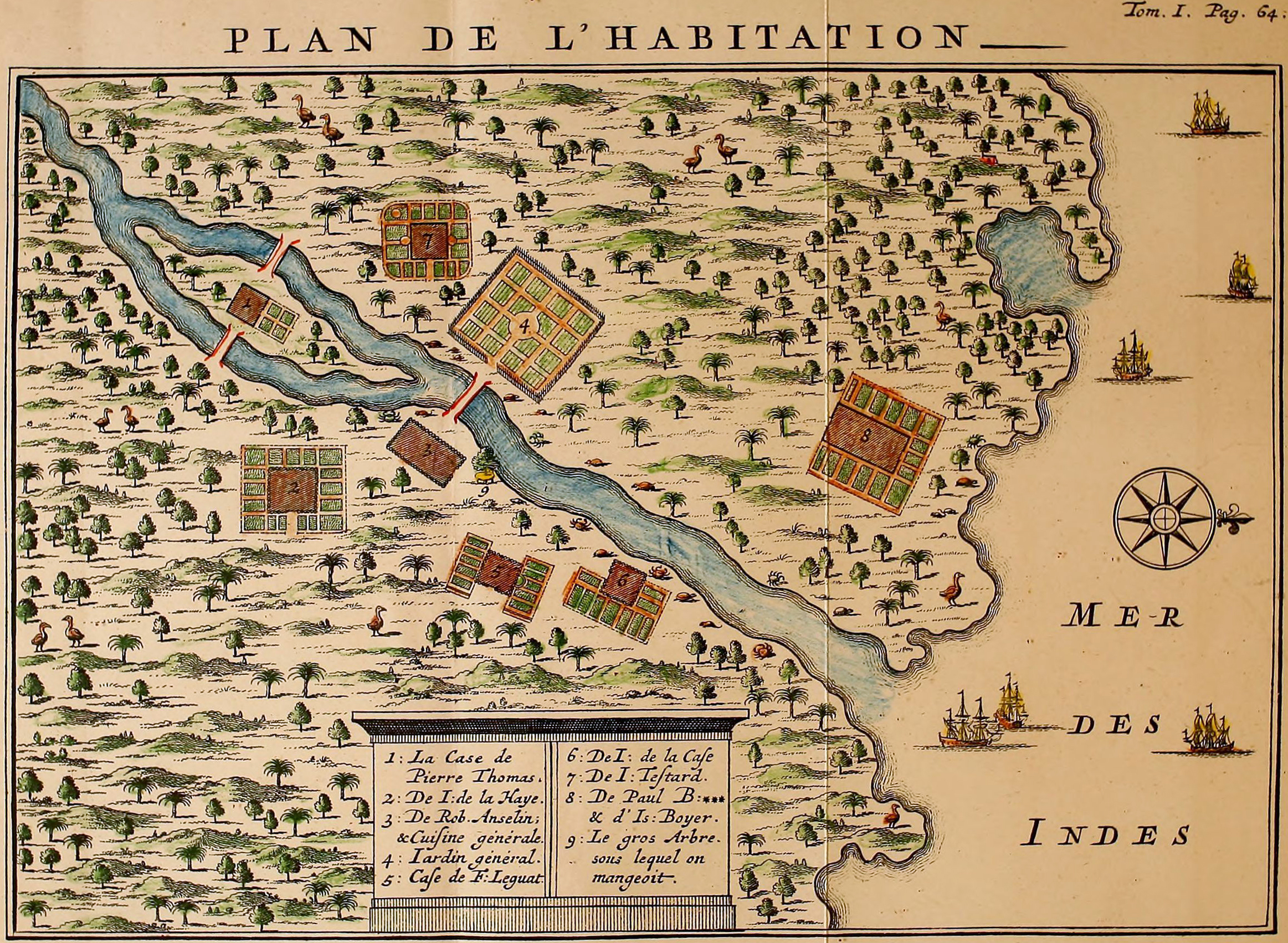
Leguat's 1708 maps of Rodrigues and his settlement. Rodrigues solitaires are distributed across the maps, many in pairs

The Dutch viceadmiral Hans Hendricksz Bouwer was the first to list "dodos", most likely referring to the Rodrigues solitaire, as part of the fauna of Rodrigues in 1601. The English traveller Sir Thomas Herbert mentioned "dodos" on Rodrigues again in 1634, and they were also mentioned in 1700. The next account, which was the first referring to the bird as the "solitaire", was published in François Leguat's 1708 memoir, A New Voyage to the East Indies. Leguat was the leader of a group of nine French Huguenot refugees, who were the first to colonise the island from 1691 to 1693, after they were marooned there by their captain. His description of the Rodrigues solitaire and its behaviour is the most detailed account of the bird in life, and he also described other species that are now extinct. Leguat's observations are considered some of the first cohesive accounts of animal behaviour in the wild. He later left for Mauritius, but was too late to observe dodos there.

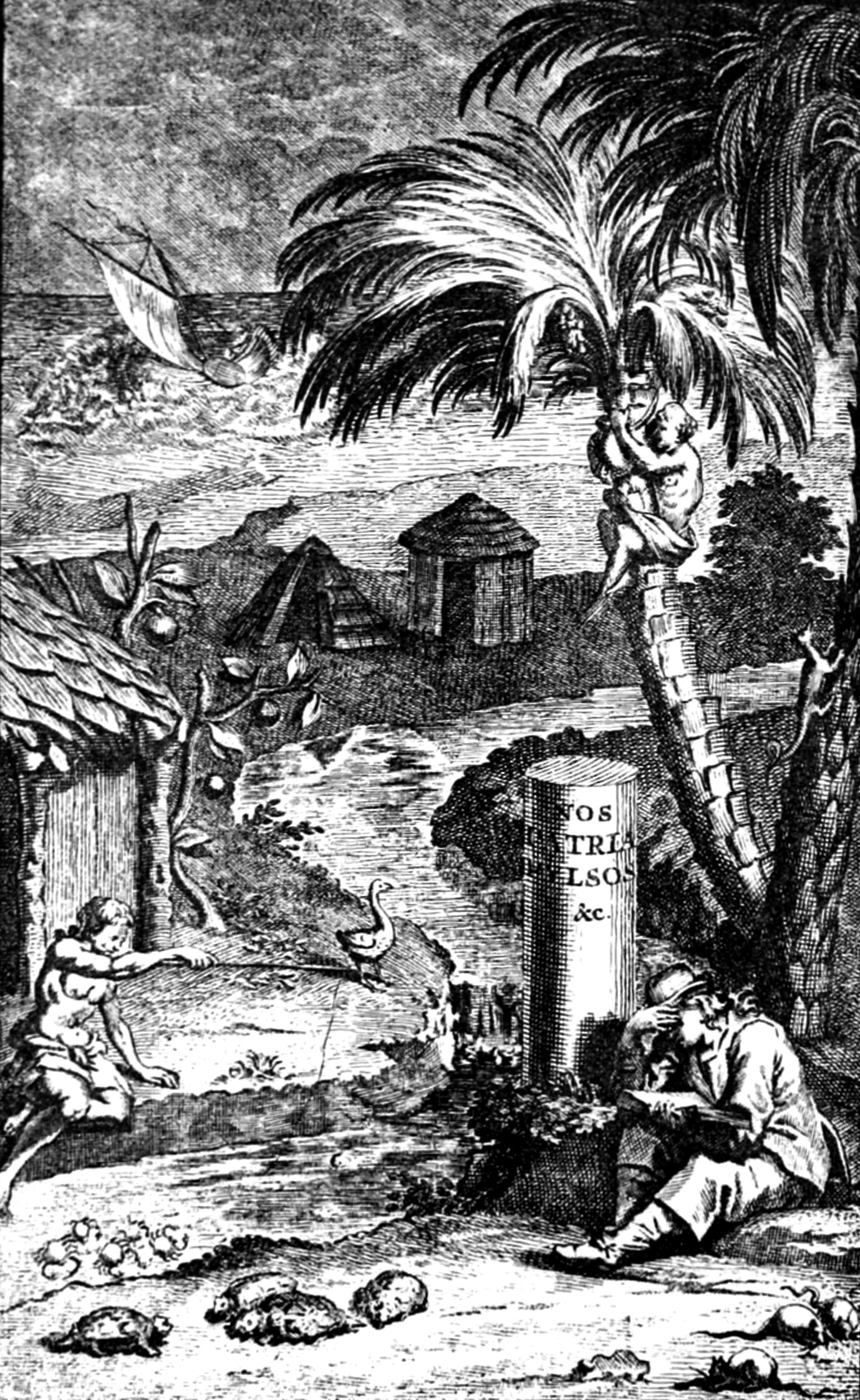
Frontispiece to Leguat's 1708 memoir, showing his settlement on Rodrigues, and a solitaire in the middle

The Huguenots praised the Rodrigues solitaires for their flavour, especially that of the young, and used their gizzard stones as knife sharpeners. D'Héguerty later claimed these were also useful in medicine, and referred to them as bezoars. The second most detailed description of the bird was found in an anonymous document rediscovered in 1874 called Relation de l'Ile Rodrigue, which has been attributed to Julien Tafforet, a mariner marooned on Rodrigues in 1726. His observations are considered credible, though it is known he had a copy of Leguat's memoirs with him during his stay.

Many old accounts mention that Rodrigues solitaires were hunted by humans. The Danish zoologist Japetus Steenstrup noted that some Rodrigues solitaire remains bore traces of having been broken by a human or perhaps another large predator, to extract bone marrow. Writing in 1735, the French lieutenant Gennes de la Chancelière described the capture and consumption of two specimens as follows:

Our men told of having seen goats and a large quantity of birds of different kinds: they brought, amongst others, two of which were bigger by a third than the largest turkey; they appeared, nevertheless to be still quite young, still having down on the neck and head; their wingtips were but sparsely feathered, without any proper tail. Three sailors told me of having seen two others, of the same species, as big as the biggest ostrich. The young ones that were brought had the head made more or less like the latter animal, but their feet were similar to those of turkeys, instead of that of the ostrich which is forked and cloven in the shape of a hind's foot. These two birds, when skinned, had an inch of fat on the body. One was made into a pie, which turned out to be so tough that it was uneatable.

Unlike the dodo, no Rodrigues solitaires are known to have been sent to Europe alive. However, it has been claimed that the French naval officer Bertrand-François Mahé de La Bourdonnais sent a "solitaire" to France from the nearby island of Réunion around 1740. Since the Réunion solitaire is believed to have become extinct by this date, the bird may actually have been a Rodrigues solitaire.

=== Extinction ===
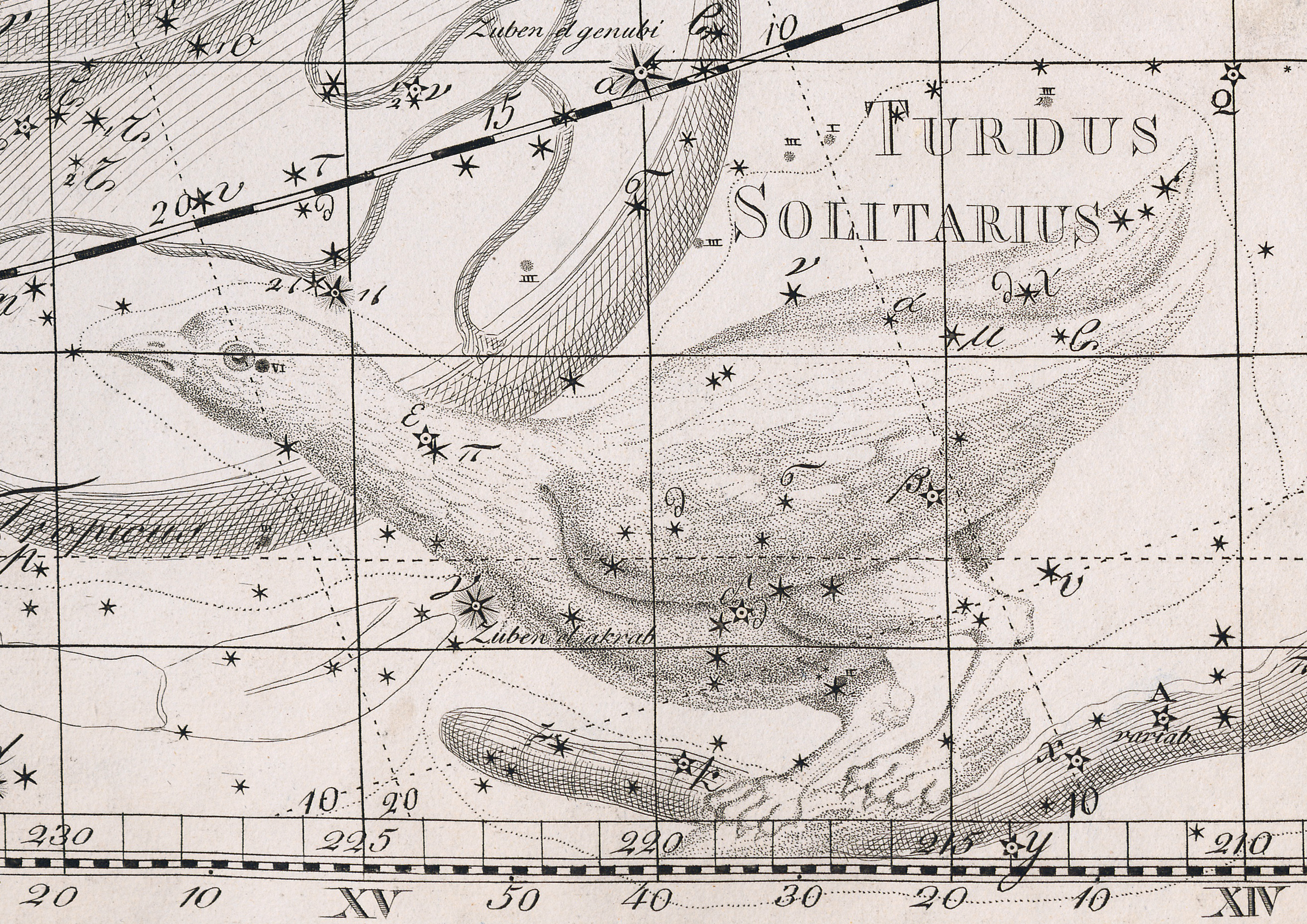
The former constellation Turdus Solitarius was named after the Rodrigues solitaire, here depicted in Uranographia by Johann Elert Bode, 1801

The Rodrigues solitaire probably became extinct sometime between the 1730s and 1760s; the exact date is unknown. Its disappearance coincided with the tortoise trade between 1730 and 1750; traders burnt off vegetation, hunted solitaires and imported cats and pigs that preyed on eggs and chicks. In 1755, the French engineer Joseph-François Charpentier de Cossigny attempted to obtain a live specimen, as he had been assured the Rodrigues solitaire still survived in remote areas of the island. Though trying for 18 months, and offering large rewards, none could be found. He noted that cats were blamed for decimating the species, but suspected that it was due to hunting by humans instead.

The French astronomer Alexandre Guy Pingré did not encounter any solitaires when he visited Rodrigues to observe the 1761 transit of Venus, although he had been assured they survived. His friend, the French astronomer Pierre Charles Le Monnier named the constellation Turdus Solitarius after the bird to commemorate the journey. Although the Rodrigues solitaire is the only extinct bird to have a former constellation named for it, celestial mapmakers did not know what it looked like and star maps depicted other birds.

By the time the discovery of subfossil Rodrigues solitaire bones from 1786 onwards confirmed Leguat's descriptions, no living residents of Rodrigues remembered having seen live specimens. In 1831, a man who had lived on Rodrigues for 40 years said that he had never seen birds large enough to be Rodrigues solitaires. Rodrigues covers only 104 square kilometres (40 sq mi), making it implausible that the bird would have survived undetected.
