= Rami =

Rami or Ramy may refer to:

== People ==
=== Given name ===
==== In music ====
- Rami (singer), Japanese singer
- Rami El-Kaleh (born 1983), Libyan-Irish musician
- Rami Jaffee (born 1969), American keyboardist
- Rami Kleinstein (born 1962), Israeli singer and composer
- Rami Yacoub (born 1975), Swedish music producer and songwriter known professionally as Rami
- Rami Yosifov, Israeli guitarist
- Rami, stage name of Shin Haram, a South Korean idol and member of K-pop group Babymonster.

==== In sports ====
- Rami Hakanpää (born 1978), Finnish footballer
- Rami Koivisto (born 1968), Finnish ice hockey player
- Rami Miron (born 1957), Olympic wrestler
- Rami Nieminen (born 1966), Finnish footballer
- Rami Sebei (born 1984), Canadian professional wrestler
- Rami Shaaban (born 1975), Swedish footballer
- Rami Zur (born 1977), American Olympic sprint canoeist

==== In law and politics ====
- Rami Jarrah (born 1984), British-Syrian award-winning journalist, a.k.a. Alexander Page
- Rami Aman (born 1981/82), Palestinian journalist and peace activist in the Gaza Strip
- Rami Hamdallah (born 1958), Palestinian prime minister

==== Other people with the given name ====
- Rami Heuberger (1963–2025), Israeli actor, comedian, and theatre director
- Rami Ismail (born 1988), Dutch-Egyptian game developer
- Rami Kashou (born 1976), Palestinian fashion designer
- Rami Malek (born 1981), American actor and producer
- Rami Mehmed Pasha (1645–1706), Ottoman statesman and poet, using the nom de plume Rami
- Rami Saari (born 1963), Israeli poet, translator, linguist and literary critic

=== Surname ===
- Adil Rami (born 1985), French footballer
- Ahmed Rami (poet) (1892–1981), Egyptian poet
- Ahmed Rami (writer) (born 1946), Swedish–Moroccan writer and Holocaust denier
- Cristian Rami (born 1980), Argentine footballer
- Franco Rami (born 2003), Argentine footballer

== Other uses ==
- The plural of ramus, literally a branch, as of a plant, nerve, or blood vessel:
  - Rami, the upward portions on both sides of the mandible
  - Superior pubic ramus
- Rochester Athenaeum and Mechanics Institute, the former name of the Rochester Institute of Technology
- Rami (Card game) or rummy, a group of card games based on matching cards of the same rank or sequence, and same suit
- Rami Barracks, 18th-century built Ottoman military facility in Istanbul, Turkey
- RAMI by J.M.K., a diecast model company that made cars in 1:43 scale in Lure, France
- Ramie or rami, a flowering plant, generally used in textiles
- Royal Academy of Medicine in Ireland (RAMI), a medical learned society
- CZ 2075 RAMI, a semi-automatic pistol

== See also ==
- Ramy
- Yousef Al Rami, the Arabic name given to Joseph of Arimathea, mentioned in the Gospels as the wealthy person in whose tomb Jesus was buried
