= Ramus =

Ramus may refer to:

- Ramus, the Latin word for branch
- A portion of a bone, as in the ramus of the mandible or superior pubic ramus
- A portion of a nerve, such as the dorsal ramus of spinal nerve
- A taxonomic rank intermediate between subkingdom and infra-kingdom
- Ramus Pomifer, a former constellation
- 102 Herculis, a star named Ramus after the constellation
- Webster, Illinois, a settlement initially known as "Ramus"

== People ==
- Petrus Ramus (1515–1572), French humanist, logician, and educational reformer
- Jonas Danilssønn Ramus (1649−1718), Norwegian priest
- Joseph-Marius Ramus (1805-1888), French sculptor
- Edmond Ramus (1822–1890), French engraver best known for his copies of paintings for art catalogues
- Sybla Ramus (1874–1963), American pianist, violinist, writer
- Pierre Ramus (1882–1942), Austrian anarchist
- Nick Ramus (1929–2007), American actor
- James Ramus (born 1935), British sailor
- Joshua Ramus (born 1969), American architect
- Tetyana Ramus (born 1980) Ukrainian artist, designer, TV and radio journalist, public activist, producer, publisher, author of television projects
- Janet Ramus, British singer
