= 95 Herculis =

Double star in the constellation Hercules

- Location of 95 Herculis (circled in red)

Observation data Epoch J2000 Equinox J2000
- Constellation: Hercules
- A
- Right ascension: 18^{h} 01^{m} 30.40868^{s}
- Declination: +21° 35′ 44.8121″
- Apparent magnitude (V): 4.83±0.01
- B
- Right ascension: 18^{h} 01^{m} 29.96397^{s}
- Declination: +21° 35′ 43.4043″
- Apparent magnitude (V): 5.10

Characteristics

A
- Evolutionary stage: Giant star or subgiant
- Spectral type: A2IV

B
- Evolutionary stage: Horizontal branch
- Spectral type: G5III

Astrometry

A
Radial velocity (R_{v})	−44.86±3.07 km/s
Proper motion (μ)	RA: +9.200 mas/yr Dec.: +38.438 mas/yr
Parallax (π)	7.5526±0.0713 mas
Distance	432 ± 4 ly (132 ± 1 pc)

B
Radial velocity (R_{v})	−32.9±0.12 km/s
Proper motion (μ)	RA: +8.995 mas/yr Dec.: +36.267 mas/yr
Parallax (π)	7.5492±0.0592 mas
Distance	432 ± 3 ly (132 ± 1 pc)

Details

A
Mass	3.1 M_{☉}
Radius	6.0 R_{☉}
Luminosity	156 L_{☉}
Temperature	8,211 K
Rotational velocity (v sin i)	233 km/s

B
Mass	3.2 M_{☉}
Radius	16.5 R_{☉}
Luminosity	172 L_{☉}
Surface gravity (log g)	2.77 cgs
Temperature	5,037 K
Rotational velocity (v sin i)	5.7 km/s
Age	979 Myr

Other designations
- 95 Her, HIP 88267, ADS 10993, WDS J18015+2136
- A: Bodu, HD 164669, HR 6730, ADS 10993, TIC 424429430, TYC 1566-3674-1
- B: HD 164668, HR 6729, TIC 424429431, TYC 1566-3675-1

Database references
SIMBAD	data
- A
- B

95 Herculis, also named Bodu, is a double stellar system in the constellation Hercules, located 432 light-years from Earth.

== Nomenclature ==
95 Herculis is the star's Flamsteed designation. This star, together with 93 Herculis, 102 Herculis, and 109 Herculis, formed the now obsolete constellation of Cerberus.

In Chinese astronomy, 95 Herculis and 102 Herculis form the asterism Bó Dù (帛度, "Textile Ruler"). The IAU Working Group on Star Names approved the name Bodu for 95 Herculis A on 17 June 2025, and it is now so entered in the IAU Catalog of Star Names.

== Characteristics ==
From the naked eye, 95 Herculis appears as a single star shining at apparent magnitude 4.31. However, when further scrutinized using a telescope, it is revealed to be a double star, with two components separated by 6.3 arcseconds. This system has a color contrast due to the difference of each star's effective temperature.

The brightest component, called 95 Herculis A, is a white giant or subgiant with an apparent magnitude of 4.8. This evolved star has 3.1 times more mass than the Sun, is six times wider, and is 156 times more luminous. Its effective temperature of 8,211 K give it a blue-white hue typical of A-type stars. It is spinning rapidly with an projected rotational velocity of 233 km/s.

The secondary is called 95 Herculis B, a yellow giant of apparent magnitude 5.1. It is the most evolved star in the pair, having reached the helium burning stage, while 95 Herculis A is still in the transition from hydrogen burning to helium burning. Albeit fainter than 95 Her A, 95 Her B emits a significant part of its luminosity in the infrared, and hence the bolometric luminosity is 172 times solar. It is 3.2 times more massive than the Sun and 16.5 times wider. The effective temperature of the star is 5,037 K.

== Orbit ==
The orbital elements of 95 Herculis are not accurately known and no orbital motion has been detected. However, their projected separation is calculated at 900 astronomical units, with an orbital period of at least 11,000 years.

== See also ==
- Albireo
- Gamma Andromedae
- Gamma Leonis
