= 109 Herculis =

Star in the constellation Hercules

- Location of 109 Herculis (circled in red)

Observation data Epoch J2000 Equinox ICRS
- Constellation: Hercules
- Right ascension: 18^{h} 23^{m} 41.88971^{s}
- Declination: +21° 46′ 11.1096″
- Apparent magnitude (V): 3.84

Characteristics
- Evolutionary stage: horizontal branch
- Spectral type: K2IIIab
- B−V color index: 1.168±0.005

Astrometry
Radial velocity (R_{v})	−57.55±0.27 km/s
Proper motion (μ)	RA: +195.971 mas/yr Dec.: −243.234 mas/yr
Parallax (π)	26.9636±0.1049 mas
Distance	121.0 ± 0.5 ly (37.1 ± 0.1 pc)
Absolute magnitude (M_{V})	+0.87

Details
Mass	1.05±0.18 M_{☉}
Radius	11.93±0.06 R_{☉}
Luminosity	52.4±3 L_{☉}
Surface gravity (log g)	2.24 cgs
Temperature	4,569±60 K
Metallicity [Fe/H]	−0.06 dex
Rotational velocity (v sin i)	4.4 km/s
Age	6.39±2.71 Gyr

Other designations
- Tusizuo, 109 Her, BD+21°3411, FK5 690, HD 169414, HIP 90139, HR 6895, SAO 86003, WDS J18237+2146

Database references
SIMBAD	data

109 Herculis, also named Tusizuo, is a single star in the northern constellation of Hercules. It is visible to the naked eye as a faint, orange-hued point of light with an apparent visual magnitude of 3.84. The star is located around 121 light-years (37 parsecs) distant, based on parallax. It is moving closer to the Earth with a heliocentric radial velocity of −58 km/s, and may come as close as 81 light-years away in around 328,000 years.

This is an aging giant star with a stellar classification of K2IIIab. It is a red clump giant, meaning it is on the horizontal branch and is generating energy through helium fusion at its core. The star is roughly six billion years old with slightly more mass than the Sun. With the supply of hydrogen at its core exhausted, it has expanded to nearly 12 times the Sun's radius. The star is radiating 52 times the luminosity of the Sun from its swollen photosphere at an effective temperature of 4,569 K.

== Nomenclature ==
In Chinese astronomy, 109 Herculis is one of two stars in the asterism Tú Sì (屠肆, "Butcher's Shop"). It is named Tusizuo, meaning the left star in Tusi. The IAU Working Group on Star Names approved the name Tusizuo for 109 Herculis on 17 June 2025 and it is now so entered in the IAU Catalog of Star Names. The name Tusi was already in use for the asteroid 10269 Tusi, named after a Persian astronomer.

This star, together with 93 Herculis, 95 Herculis (Bodu), and 102 Herculis (Ramus), formed Cerberus, the obsolete constellation.
