= 93 Herculis =

Star in the constellation Hercules

- Location of 93 Herculis (circled in red)

Observation data Epoch J2000 Equinox ICRS
- Constellation: Hercules
- Right ascension: 18^{h} 00^{m} 03.41611^{s}
- Declination: +16° 45′ 03.2855″
- Apparent magnitude (V): 4.67

Characteristics
- Spectral type: K0.5IIb
- B−V color index: 1.254±0.007

Astrometry
Radial velocity (R_{v})	−24.47±0.20 km/s
Proper motion (μ)	RA: −6.878 mas/yr Dec.: −9.696 mas/yr
Parallax (π)	4.5894±0.3311 mas
Distance	710 ± 50 ly (220 ± 20 pc)
Absolute magnitude (M_{V})	−1.85

Details
Radius	47 R_{☉}
Luminosity	868 L_{☉}
Surface gravity (log g)	1.74 cgs
Temperature	4,594 K
Metallicity [Fe/H]	−0.01 dex
Rotational velocity (v sin i)	1.3 km/s

Other designations
- 93 Her, BD+16°3335, FK5 1469, HD 164349, HIP 88128, HR 6713, SAO 103285

Database references
SIMBAD	data

93 Herculis is a star located around 750 light years away from the Sun in the northern constellation of Hercules. It is visible to the naked eye as a faint, orange-hued star with an apparent visual magnitude of 4.67 The brightness of the star is diminished by an extinction of 0.21 due to interstellar dust. It is moving closer to the Earth with a heliocentric radial velocity of −24.5 km/s. This star, together with 95 Her, 102 Her, and 109 Her, made up the obsolete constellation Cerberus.

This object has a stellar classification of K0.5IIb, which indicates it is an evolved bright giant. With the supply of hydrogen at its core exhausted, the star has expanded to 47 times the Sun's radius. It is radiating around 868 times the luminosity of the Sun from its enlarged photosphere at an effective temperature of 4,594 K. It is generally deficient in metal elements, but appears weakly enhanced in barium and other heavier elements. This is a suspected barium star and hence may have a white dwarf companion in orbit.
