= Cerberus =

Multi-headed dog in Greek mythology

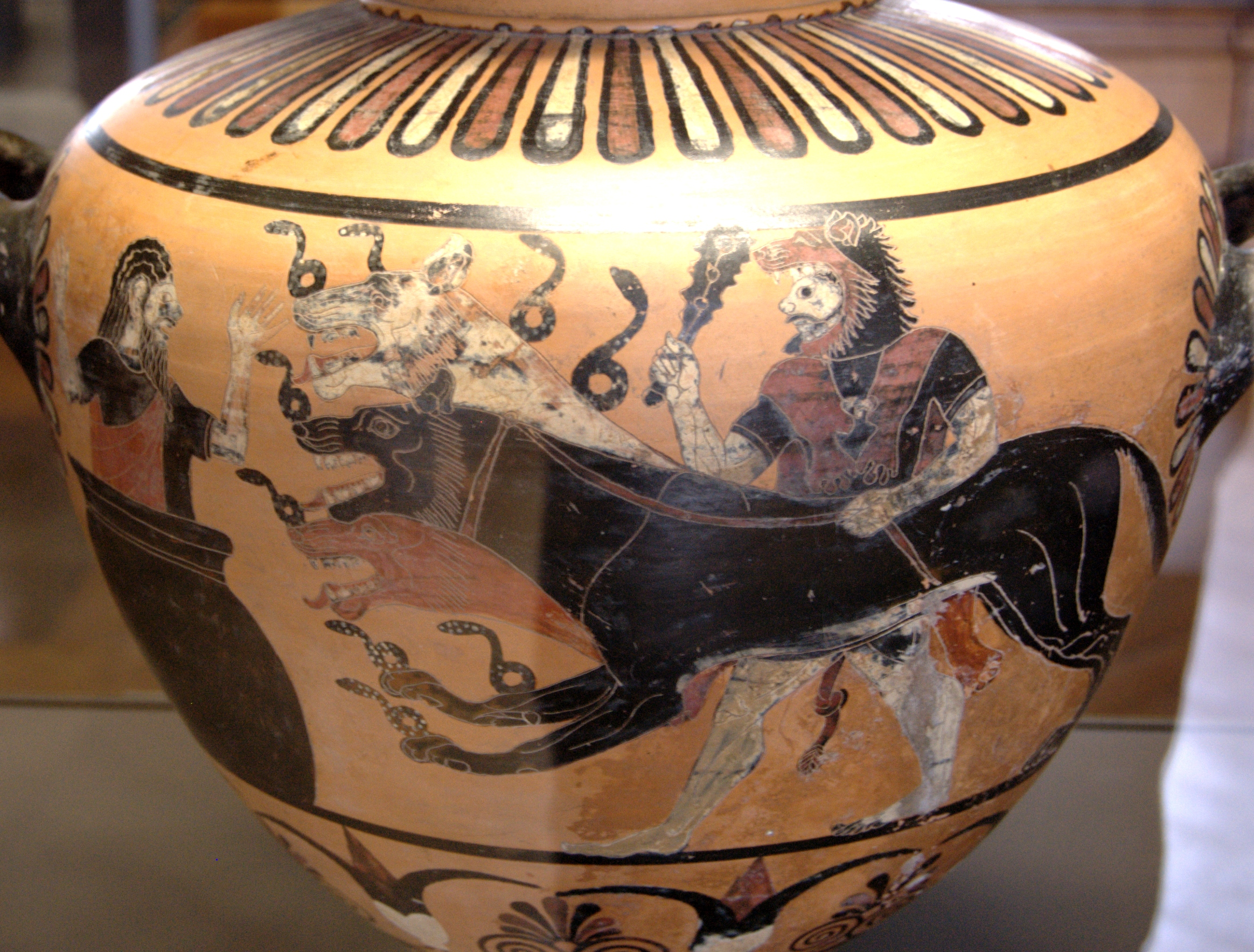
Heracles, wearing his characteristic lion-skin, club in right hand, leash in left, presenting a three-headed Cerberus, snakes coiling from his snouts, necks and front paws, to a frightened Eurystheus hiding in a giant pot. Caeretan hydria (c. 530 BC) from Caere (Louvre E701)

In Greek mythology, Cerberus (/ˈsɜːrbərəs/ or /ˈkɜːrbərəs/; Ancient Greek: Κέρβερος Kérberos [ˈkerberos]), often referred to as the hound of Hades, is a multi-headed dog that guards the gates of the underworld to prevent the dead from leaving. He was the offspring of the monsters Typhon and Echidna, and was usually described as having three heads, a serpent for a tail, and snakes protruding from his body. Cerberus is primarily known for his capture by Heracles, the last of Heracles' twelve labours.

== Etymology ==
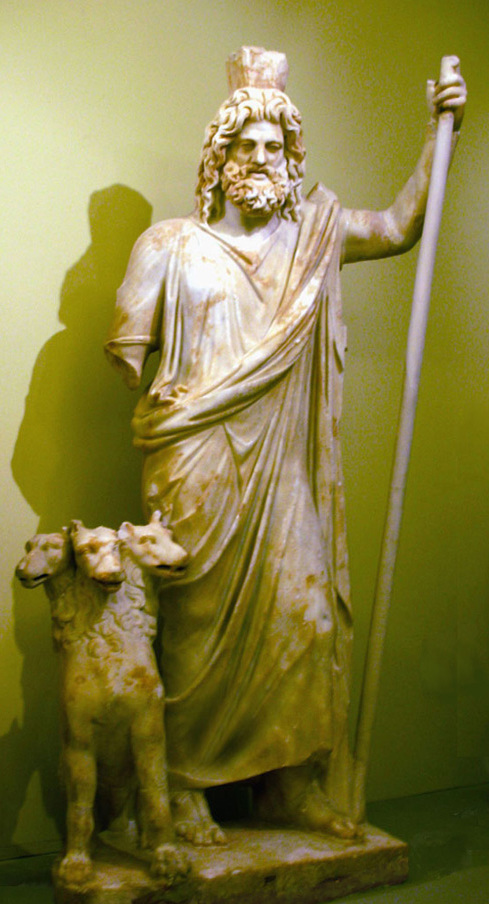
Cerberus and Hades/Serapis. Heraklion Archaeological Museum, Crete, Greece

The etymology of Cerberus' name is uncertain. Daniel Ogden refers to attempts to establish an Indo-European etymology as "not yet successful". It has been claimed to be related to the Sanskrit word सर्वरा sarvarā, used as an epithet of one of the dogs of Yama, from a Proto-Indo-European word *k̑érberos, meaning "spotted". Lincoln (1991), among others, critiques this etymology. This etymology was also rejected by Manfred Mayrhofer, who proposed an Austro-Asiatic origin for the word, and by Beekes. Lincoln notes a similarity between Cerberus and the Norse mythological dog Garmr, relating both names to a Proto-Indo-European root *ger- "to growl" (perhaps with the suffixes -*m/*b and -*r). However, as Ogden observes, this analysis actually requires Kerberos and Garmr to be derived from two different Indo-European roots (*ker- and *gher- respectively), and so does not actually establish a relationship between the two names.

Though probably not Greek, Greek etymologies for Cerberus have been offered. An etymology given by Servius (the late-fourth-century commentator on Virgil)—but rejected by Ogden—derives Cerberus from the Greek word creoboros meaning "flesh-devouring". Another suggested etymology derives Cerberus from Greek: κὴρ βερέθρου, romanized: ker berethrou, meaning "evil of the pit".

== Descriptions ==
Descriptions of Cerberus vary, including the number of his heads. Cerberus was usually three-headed, though not always. Cerberus had several multi-headed relatives: his father was the multi snake-footed Typhon, and Cerberus was the brother of three other multi-headed monsters, the multi-snake-headed Lernaean Hydra; Orthrus, the two-headed dog that guarded the Cattle of Geryon; and the Chimera, who had three heads: that of a lion, a goat, and a snake. And, like these close relatives, Cerberus was, with only the rare iconographic exception, multi-headed.

In the earliest description of Cerberus, Hesiod's Theogony (c. 8th – 7th century BC), Cerberus has fifty heads, while Pindar (c. 522 – c. 443 BC) gave him one hundred heads. However, later writers almost universally give Cerberus three heads. An exception is the Latin poet Horace's Cerberus which has a single dog head, and one hundred snake heads. Perhaps trying to reconcile these competing traditions, Apollodorus's Cerberus has three dog heads and the heads of "all sorts of snakes" along his back, while the Byzantine poet John Tzetzes (who probably based his account on Apollodorus) gives Cerberus fifty heads, three of which were dog heads, the rest being the "heads of other beasts of all sorts".

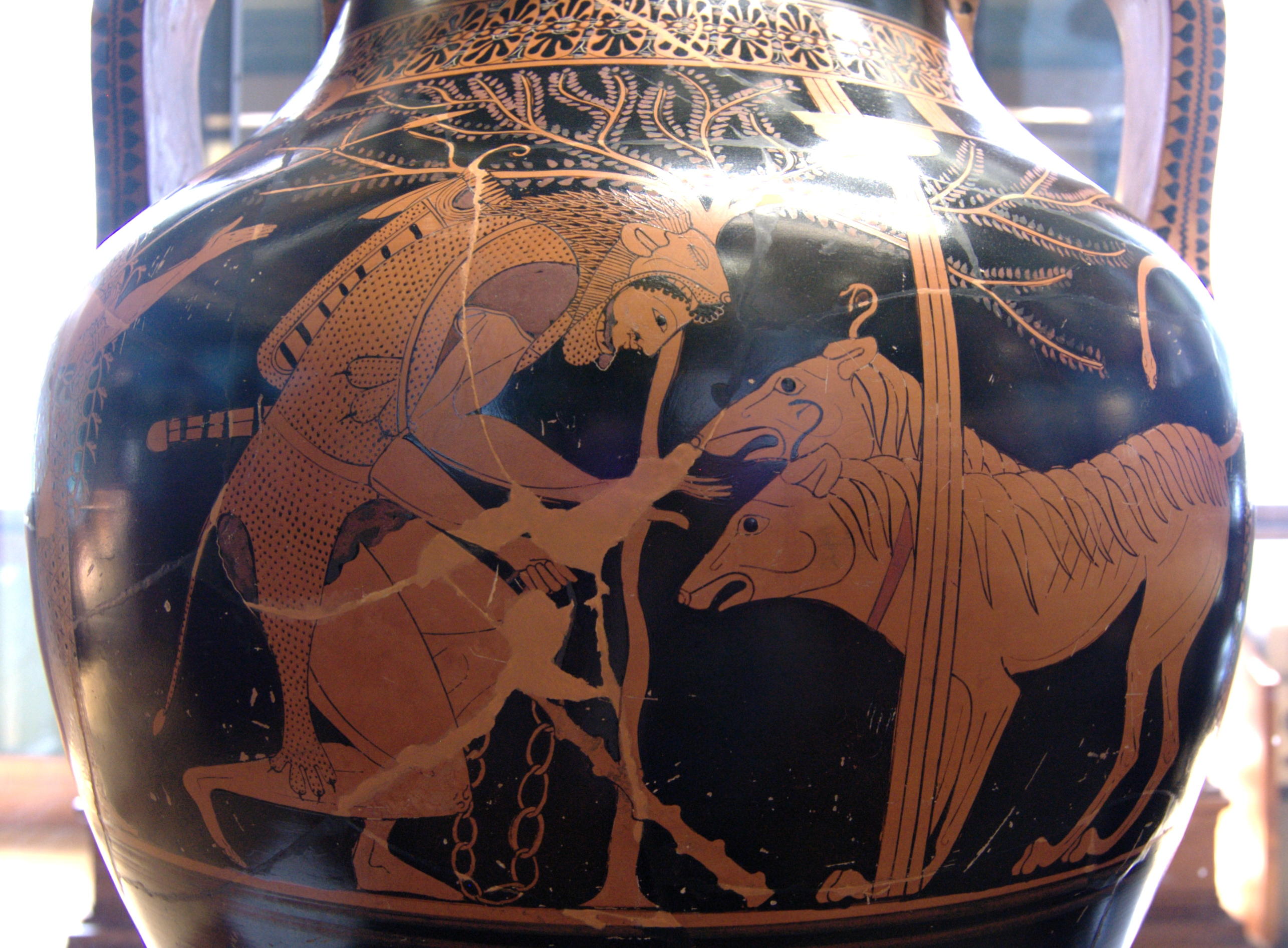
Heracles, chain in left hand, his club laid aside, calms a two-headed Cerberus, which has a snake protruding from each of his heads, a mane down his necks and back, and a snake tail. Cerberus is emerging from a portico, which represents the palace of Hades in the underworld. Between them, a tree represents the sacred grove of Hades' wife Persephone. On the far left, Athena stands, left arm extended. Amphora (c. 525–510 BC) from Vulci (Louvre F204).

In art Cerberus is most commonly depicted with two dog heads (visible), never more than three, but occasionally with only one. On one of the two earliest depictions (c. 590–580 BC), a Corinthian cup from Argos (see below), now lost, Cerberus was shown as a normal single-headed dog. The first appearance of a three-headed Cerberus occurs on a mid-sixth-century BC Laconian cup (see below).

Horace's many snake-headed Cerberus followed a long tradition of Cerberus being part snake. This is perhaps already implied as early as in Hesiod's Theogony, where Cerberus' mother is the half-snake Echidna, and his father the snake-headed Typhon. In art, Cerberus is often shown as being part snake, for example the lost Corinthian cup showed snakes protruding from Cerberus' body, while the mid sixth-century BC Laconian cup gives Cerberus a snake for a tail. In the literary record, the first certain indication of Cerberus' serpentine nature comes from the rationalized account of Hecataeus of Miletus (fl. 500–494 BC), who makes Cerberus a large poisonous snake. Plato refers to Cerberus' composite nature, and Euphorion of Chalcis (3rd century BC) describes Cerberus as having multiple snake tails, and presumably in connection to his serpentine nature, associates Cerberus with the creation of the poisonous aconite plant. Virgil has snakes writhe around Cerberus' neck, Ovid's Cerberus has a venomous mouth, necks "vile with snakes", and "hair inwoven with the threatening snake", while Seneca gives Cerberus a mane consisting of snakes, and a single snake tail.

Cerberus was given various other traits. According to Euripides, Cerberus not only had three heads but three bodies, and according to Virgil he had multiple backs. Cerberus ate raw flesh (according to Hesiod), had eyes which flashed fire (according to Euphorion), a three-tongued mouth (according to Horace), and acute hearing (according to Seneca).

== Twelfth Labour of Heracles ==
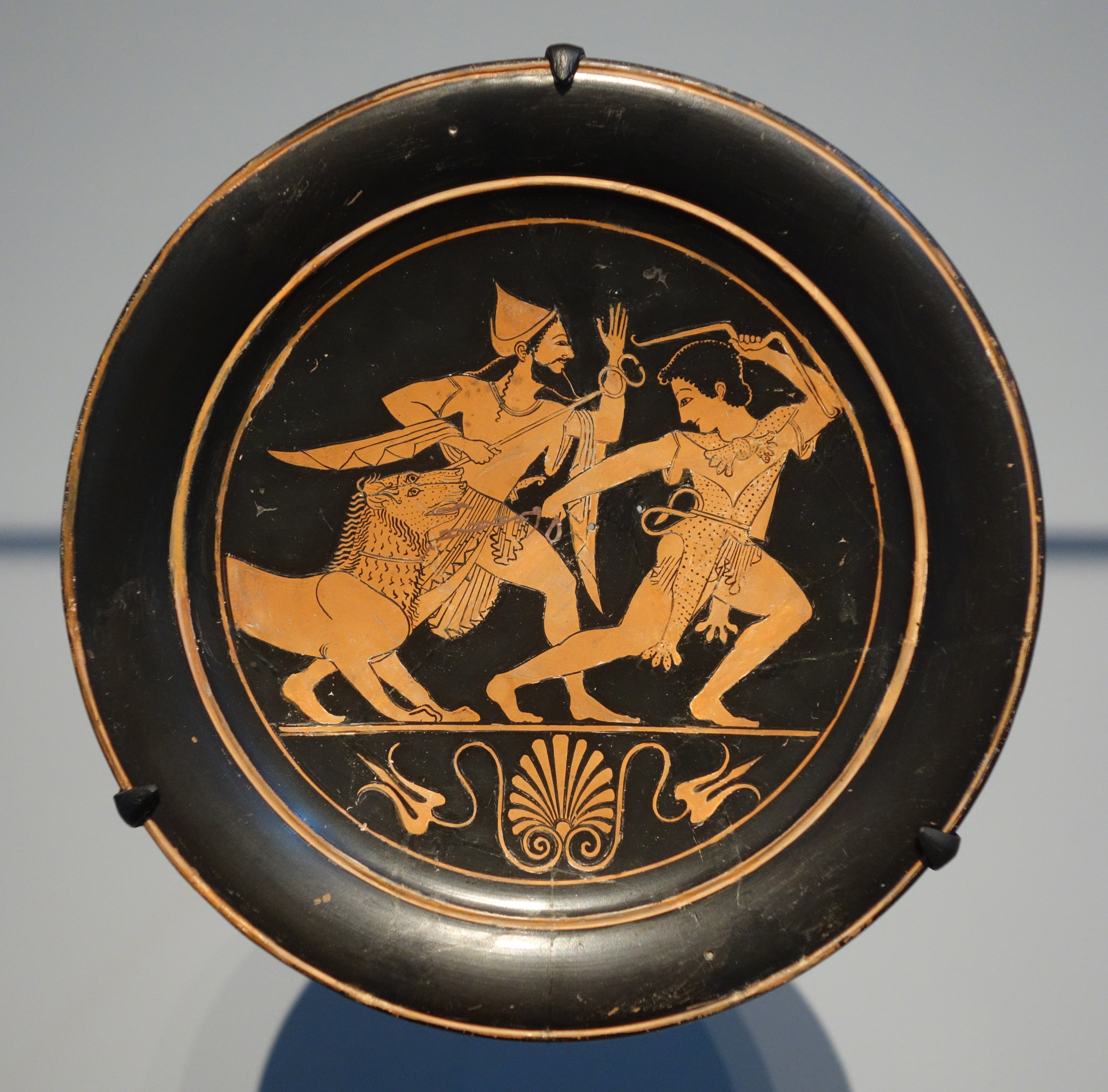
Heracles, accompanied by Hermes, leading a two-headed Cerberus out of the underworld. Plate (c. 520–510 BC) attributed to Paseas (also known as the Cerberus Painter) (Boston MFA 01.8025).

Cerberus' only mythology concerns his capture by Heracles. As early as Homer we learn that Heracles was sent by Eurystheus, the king of Tiryns, to bring back Cerberus from Hades the king of the underworld. According to Apollodorus, this was the twelfth and final labour imposed on Heracles. In a fragment from a lost play Pirithous, (attributed to either Euripides or Critias) Heracles says that, although Eurystheus commanded him to bring back Cerberus, it was not from any desire to see Cerberus, but only because Eurystheus thought that the task was impossible.

Heracles was aided in his mission by his being an initiate of the Eleusinian Mysteries. Euripides has his initiation being "lucky" for Heracles in capturing Cerberus. And both Diodorus Siculus and Apollodorus say that Heracles was initiated into the Mysteries, in preparation for his descent into the underworld. According to Diodorus, Heracles went to Athens, where Musaeus, the son of Orpheus, was in charge of the initiation rites, while according to Apollodorus, he went to Eumolpus at Eleusis.

Heracles also had the help of Hermes, the usual guide of the underworld, as well as Athena. In the Odyssey, Homer has Hermes and Athena as his guides. And Hermes and Athena are often shown with Heracles on vase paintings depicting Cerberus' capture. By most accounts, Heracles made his descent into the underworld through an entrance at Tainaron, the most famous of the various Greek entrances to the underworld. The place is first mentioned in connection with the Cerberus story in the rationalized account of Hecataeus of Miletus (fl. 500–494 BC), and Euripides, Seneca, and Apolodorus, all have Heracles descend into the underworld there. However Xenophon reports that Heracles was said to have descended at the Acherusian Chersonese near Heraclea Pontica, on the Black Sea, a place more usually associated with Heracles' exit from the underworld (see below). Heraclea, founded c. 560 BC, perhaps took its name from the association of its site with Heracles' Cerberian exploit.

=== Theseus and Pirithous ===
While in the underworld, Heracles met the heroes Theseus and Pirithous, where the two companions were being held prisoner by Hades for attempting to carry off Hades's wife Persephone. Along with bringing back Cerberus, Heracles also managed (usually) to rescue Theseus, and in some versions Pirithous as well. According to Apollodorus, Heracles found Theseus and Pirithous near the gates of Hades, bound to the "Chair of Forgetfulness, to which they grew and were held fast by coils of serpents", and when they saw Heracles, "they stretched out their hands as if they should be raised from the dead by his might", and Heracles was able to free Theseus, but when he tried to raise up Pirithous, "the earth quaked and he let go."

The earliest evidence for the involvement of Theseus and Pirithous in the Cerberus story, is found on a shield-band relief (c. 560 BC) from Olympia, where Theseus and Pirithous (named) are seated together on a chair, arms held out in supplication, while Heracles approaches, about to draw his sword. The earliest literary mention of the rescue occurs in Euripides, where Heracles saves Theseus (with no mention of Pirithous). In the lost play Pirithous, both heroes are rescued, while in the rationalized account of Philochorus, Heracles was able to rescue Theseus, but not Pirithous. In one place Diodorus says Heracles brought back both Theseus and Pirithous, by the favor of Persephone, while in another he says that Pirithous remained in Hades, or according to "some writers of myth" that neither Theseus, nor Pirithous returned. Both are rescued in the Fabulae of Hyginus. Finally, there is a version where Cerberus eats Pirithous.

=== Capture ===
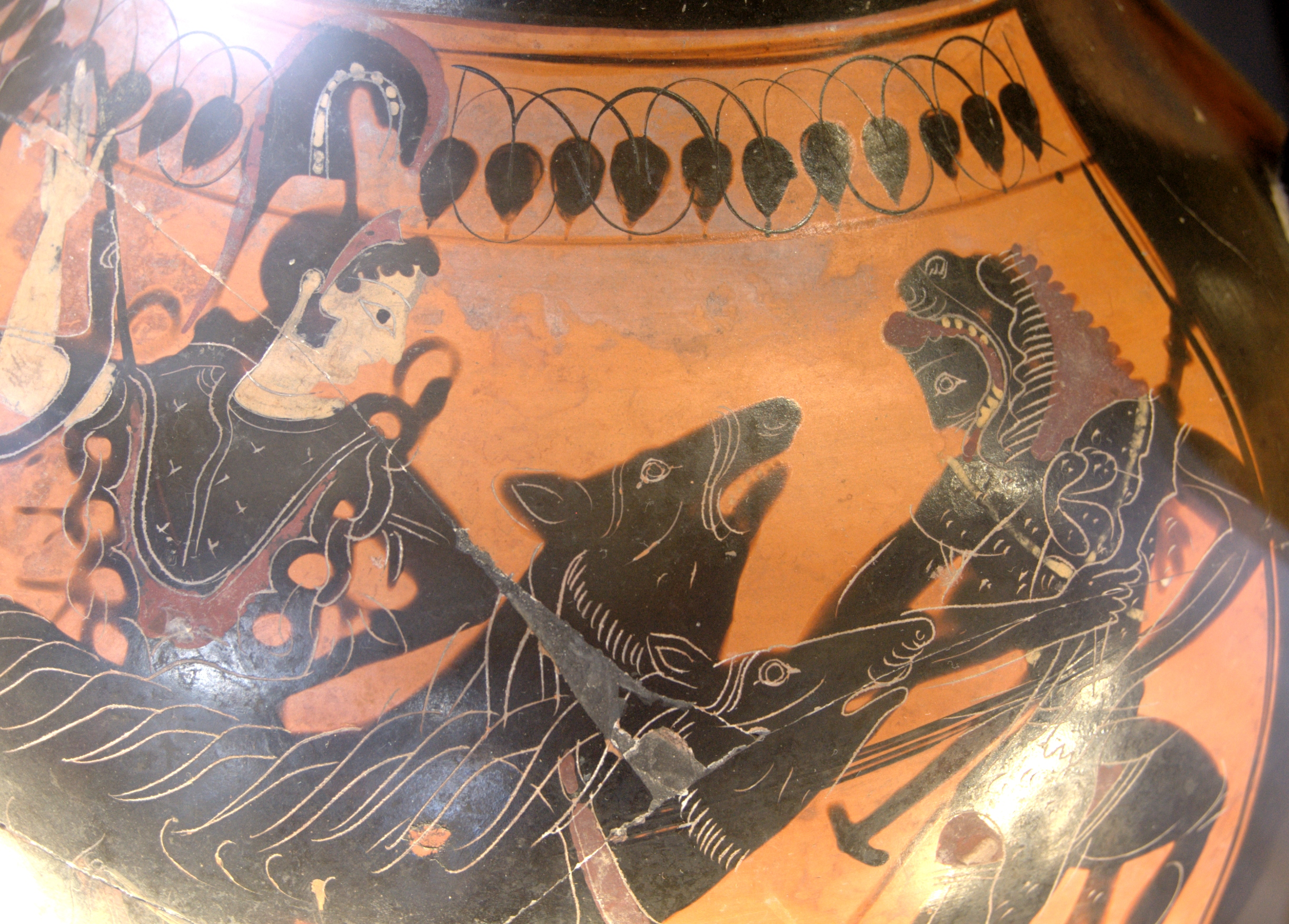
Athena, Heracles, and a two-headed Cerberus, with mane down his necks and back. Hermes (not shown in the photograph) stands to the left of Athena. An amphora (c. 575–525 BC) from Kameiros, Rhodes (Louvre A481).

There are various versions of how Heracles accomplished Cerberus' capture. According to Apollodorus, Heracles asked Hades for Cerberus, and Hades told Heracles he would allow him to take Cerberus only if he "mastered him without the use of the weapons which he carried", and so, using his lion-skin as a shield, Heracles squeezed Cerberus around the head until he submitted.

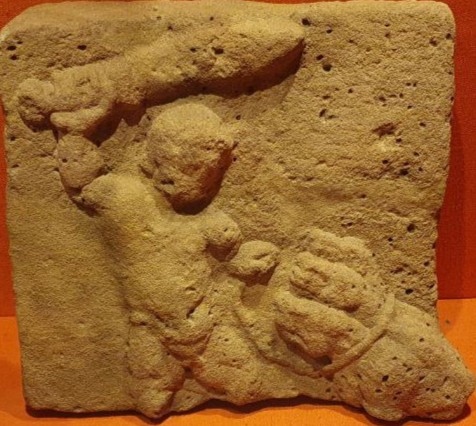
Hercules and Cerberus. From the Mithraeum I of Stockstadt

In some early sources Cerberus' capture seems to involve Heracles fighting Hades. Homer (Iliad 5.395–397) has Hades injured by an arrow shot by Heracles. A scholium to the Iliad passage, explains that Hades had commanded that Heracles "master Cerberus without shield or Iron". Heracles did this, by (as in Apollodorus) using his lion-skin instead of his shield, and making stone points for his arrows, but when Hades still opposed him, Heracles shot Hades in anger. Consistent with the no iron requirement, on an early-sixth-century BC lost Corinthian cup, Heracles is shown attacking Hades with a stone, while the iconographic tradition, from c. 560 BC, often shows Heracles using his wooden club against Cerberus.

Euripides has Amphitryon ask Heracles: "Did you conquer him in fight, or receive him from the goddess [i.e. Persephone]?" To which Heracles answers: "In fight", and the Pirithous fragment says that Heracles "overcame the beast by force". However, according to Diodorus, Persephone welcomed Heracles "like a brother" and gave Cerberus "in chains" to Heracles. Aristophanes has Heracles seize Cerberus in a stranglehold and run off, while Seneca has Heracles again use his lion-skin as shield, and his wooden club, to subdue Cerberus, after which a quailing Hades and Persephone allow Heracles to lead a chained and submissive Cerberus away. Cerberus is often shown being chained, and Ovid tells that Heracles dragged the three headed Cerberus with chains of adamant.

=== Exit from the underworld ===
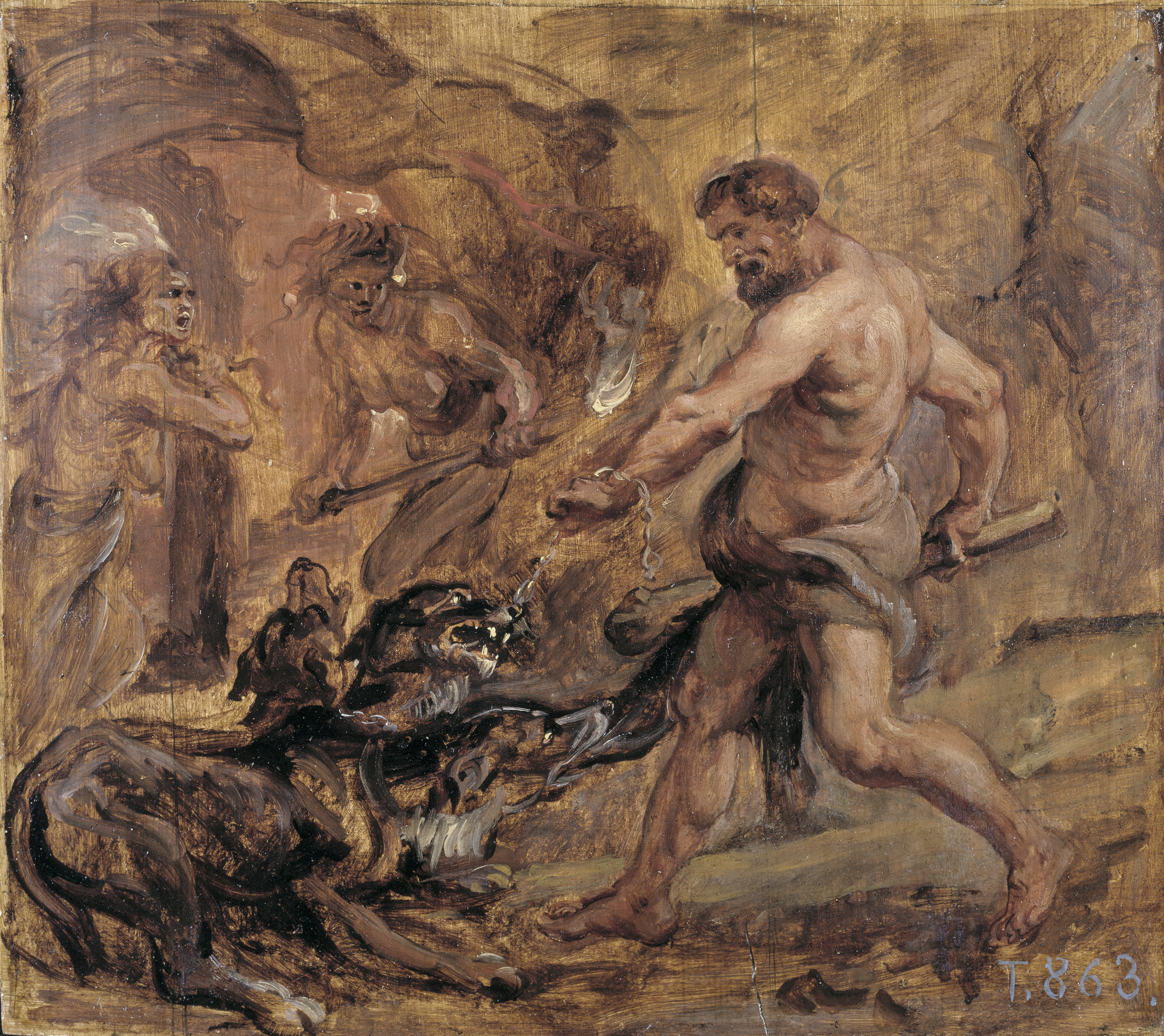
Hercules and Cerberus. Oil on canvas, by Peter Paul Rubens 1636, Prado Museum

There were several locations which were said to be the place where Heracles brought up Cerberus from the underworld. The geographer Strabo (63/64 BC – c. AD 24) reports that "according to the myth writers" Cerberus was brought up at Tainaron, the same place where Euripides has Heracles enter the underworld. Seneca has Heracles enter and exit at Tainaron. Apollodorus, although he has Heracles enter at Tainaron, has him exit at Troezen. The geographer Pausanias tells us that there was a temple at Troezen with "altars to the gods said to rule under the earth", where it was said that, in addition to Cerberus being "dragged" up by Heracles, Semele was supposed to have been brought up out of the underworld by Dionysus.

Another tradition had Cerberus brought up at Heraclea Pontica (the same place which Xenophon had earlier associated with Heracles' descent) and the cause of the poisonous plant aconite which grew there in abundance. Herodorus of Heraclea and Euphorion said that when Heracles brought Cerberus up from the underworld at Heraclea, Cerberus "vomited bile" from which the aconite plant grew up. Ovid, also makes Cerberus the cause of the poisonous aconite, saying that on the "shores of Scythia", upon leaving the underworld, as Cerberus was being dragged by Heracles from a cave, dazzled by the unaccustomed daylight, Cerberus spewed out a "poison-foam", which made the aconite plants growing there poisonous. Seneca's Cerberus too, like Ovid's, reacts violently to his first sight of daylight. Enraged, the previously submissive Cerberus struggles furiously, and Heracles and Theseus must together drag Cerberus into the light.

Pausanias reports that according to local legend Cerberus was brought up through a chasm in the earth dedicated to Clymenus (Hades) next to the sanctuary of Chthonia at Hermione, and in Euripides' Heracles, though Euripides does not say that Cerberus was brought out there, he has Cerberus kept for a while in the "grove of Chthonia" at Hermione. Pausanias also mentions that at Mount Laphystion in Boeotia, that there was a statue of Heracles Charops ("with bright eyes"), where the Boeotians said Heracles brought up Cerberus. Other locations which perhaps were also associated with Cerberus being brought out of the underworld include, Hierapolis, Thesprotia, and Emeia near Mycenae.

=== Presented to Eurystheus, returned to Hades ===
In some accounts, after bringing Cerberus up from the underworld, Heracles paraded the captured Cerberus through Greece. Euphorion has Heracles lead Cerberus through Midea in Argolis, as women and children watch in fear, and Diodorus Siculus says of Cerberus, that Heracles "carried him away to the amazement of all and exhibited him to men." Seneca has Juno complain of Heracles "highhandedly parading the black hound through Argive cities" and Heracles greeted by laurel-wreathed crowds, "singing" his praises.

Then, according to Apollodorus, Heracles showed Cerberus to Eurystheus, as commanded, after which he returned Cerberus to the underworld. However, according to Hesychius of Alexandria, Cerberus escaped, presumably returning to the underworld on his own.

== Principal sources ==
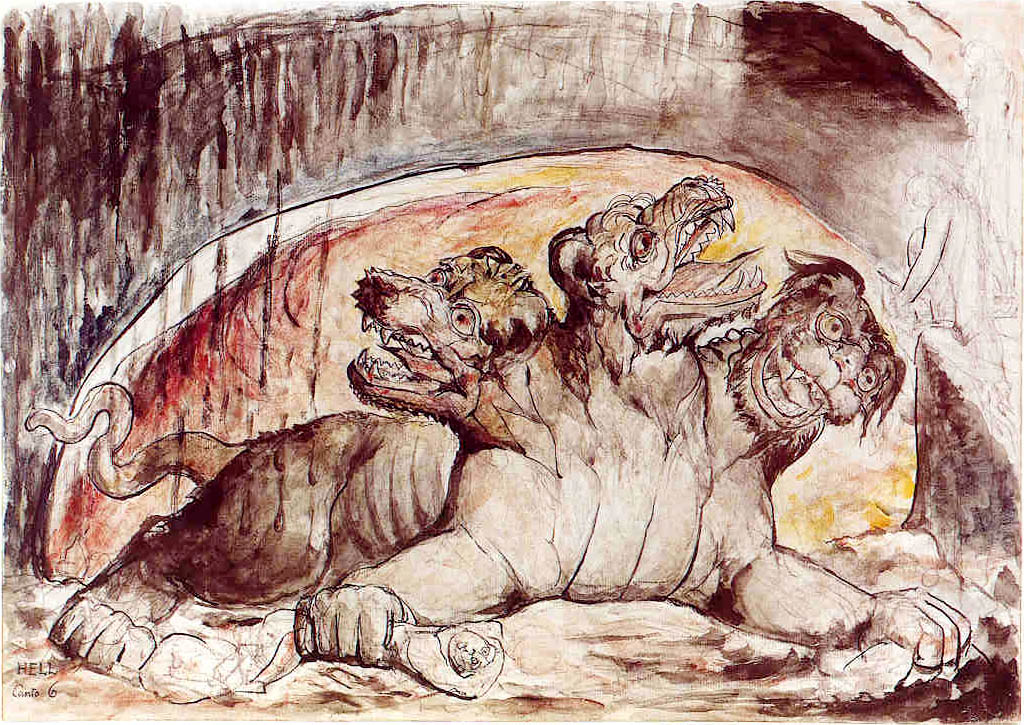
Cerberus, with the gluttons in Dante's Third Circle of Hell. William Blake

The earliest mentions of Cerberus (c. 8th – 7th century BC) occur in Homer's Iliad and Odyssey, and Hesiod's Theogony. Homer does not name or describe Cerberus, but simply refers to Heracles being sent by Eurystheus to fetch the "hound of Hades", with Hermes and Athena as his guides, and, in a possible reference to Cerberus' capture, that Heracles shot Hades with an arrow. According to Hesiod, Cerberus was the offspring of the monsters Echidna and Typhon, was fifty-headed, ate raw flesh, and was the "brazen-voiced hound of Hades", who fawns on those that enter the house of Hades, but eats those who try to leave.

Stesichorus (c. 630 – 555 BC) apparently wrote a poem called Cerberus, of which virtually nothing remains. However the early-sixth-century BC-lost Corinthian cup from Argos, which showed a single head, and snakes growing out from many places on his body, was possibly influenced by Stesichorus' poem. The mid-sixth-century BC cup from Laconia gives Cerberus three heads and a snake tail, which eventually becomes the standard representation.

Pindar (c. 522 – c. 443 BC) apparently gave Cerberus one hundred heads. Bacchylides (5th century BC) also mentions Heracles bringing Cerberus up from the underworld, with no further details. Sophocles (c. 495 – c. 405 BC), in his Women of Trachis, makes Cerberus three-headed, and in his Oedipus at Colonus, the Chorus asks that Oedipus be allowed to pass the gates of the underworld undisturbed by Cerberus, called here the "untamable Watcher of Hades". Euripides (c. 480 – 406 BC) describes Cerberus as three-headed, and three-bodied, says that Heracles entered the underworld at Tainaron, has Heracles say that Cerberus was not given to him by Persephone, but rather he fought and conquered Cerberus, "for I had been lucky enough to witness the rites of the initiated", an apparent reference to his initiation into the Eleusinian Mysteries, and says that the capture of Cerberus was the last of Heracles' labors. The lost play Pirthous (attributed to either Euripides or his late contemporary Critias) has Heracles say that he came to the underworld at the command of Eurystheus, who had ordered him to bring back Cerberus alive, not because he wanted to see Cerberus, but only because Eurystheus thought Heracles would not be able to accomplish the task, and that Heracles "overcame the beast" and "received favour from the gods".

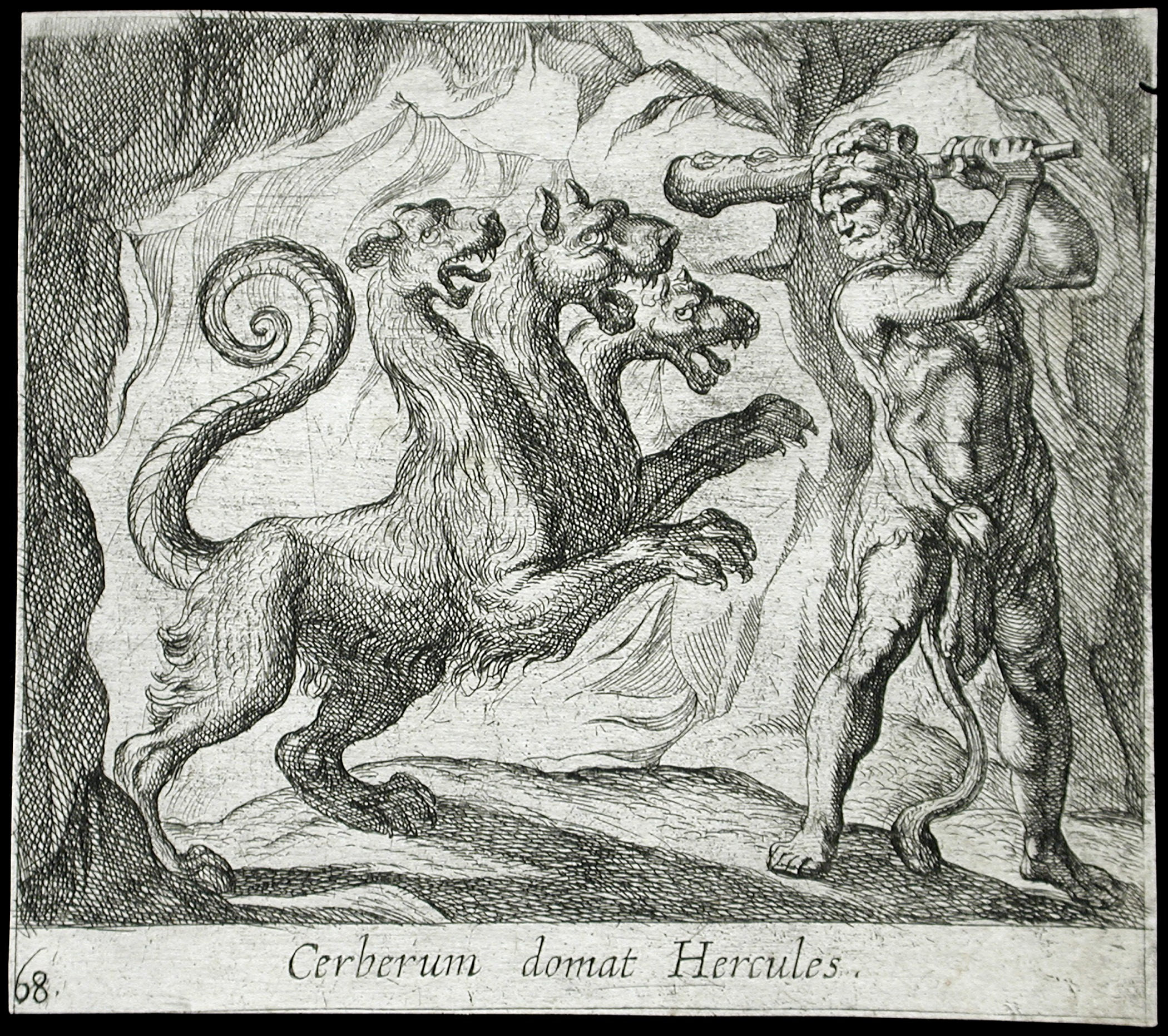
Cerberus and Heracles. Etching by Antonio Tempesta (Florence, Italy, 1555–1630). The Los Angeles County Museum of Art.

Plato (c. 425 – 348 BC) refers to Cerberus' composite nature, citing Cerberus, along with Scylla and the Chimera, as an example from "ancient fables" of a creature composed of many animal forms "grown together in one". Euphorion of Chalcis (3rd century BC) describes Cerberus as having multiple snake tails, and eyes that flashed, like sparks from a blacksmith's forge, or the volcanic Mount Etna. From Euphorion, also comes the first mention of a story which told that at Heraclea Pontica, where Cerberus was brought out of the underworld, by Heracles, Cerberus "vomited bile" from which the poisonous aconite plant grew up.

According to Diodorus Siculus (1st century BC), the capture of Cerberus was the eleventh of Heracles' labors, the twelfth and last being stealing the Apples of the Hesperides. Diodorus says that Heracles thought it best to first go to Athens to take part in the Eleusinian Mysteries, "Musaeus, the son of Orpheus, being at that time in charge of the initiatory rites", after which, he entered into the underworld "welcomed like a brother by Persephone", and "receiving the dog Cerberus in chains he carried him away to the amazement of all and exhibited him to men."

In Virgil's Aeneid (1st century BC), Aeneas and the Sibyl encounter Cerberus in a cave, where he "lay at vast length", filling the cave "from end to end", blocking the entrance to the underworld. Cerberus is described as "triple-throated", with "three fierce mouths", multiple "large backs", and serpents writhing around his neck. The Sibyl throws Cerberus a loaf laced with honey and herbs to induce sleep, enabling Aeneas to enter the underworld, and so apparently for Virgil—contradicting Hesiod—Cerberus guarded the underworld against entrance. Later Virgil describes Cerberus, in his bloody cave, crouching over half-gnawed bones. In his Georgics, Virgil refers to Cerberus, his "triple jaws agape" being tamed by Orpheus' playing his lyre.

Horace (65 – 8 BC) also refers to Cerberus yielding to Orpheus' lyre, here Cerberus has a single dog head, which "like a Fury's is fortified by a hundred snakes", with a "triple-tongued mouth" oozing "fetid breath and gore".

Ovid (43 BC – AD 17/18) has Cerberus' mouth produce venom, and like Euphorion, makes Cerberus the cause of the poisonous plant aconite. According to Ovid, Heracles dragged Cerberus from the underworld, emerging from a cave "where 'tis fabled, the plant grew / on soil infected by Cerberian teeth", and dazzled by the daylight, Cerberus spewed out a "poison-foam", which made the aconite plants growing there poisonous.

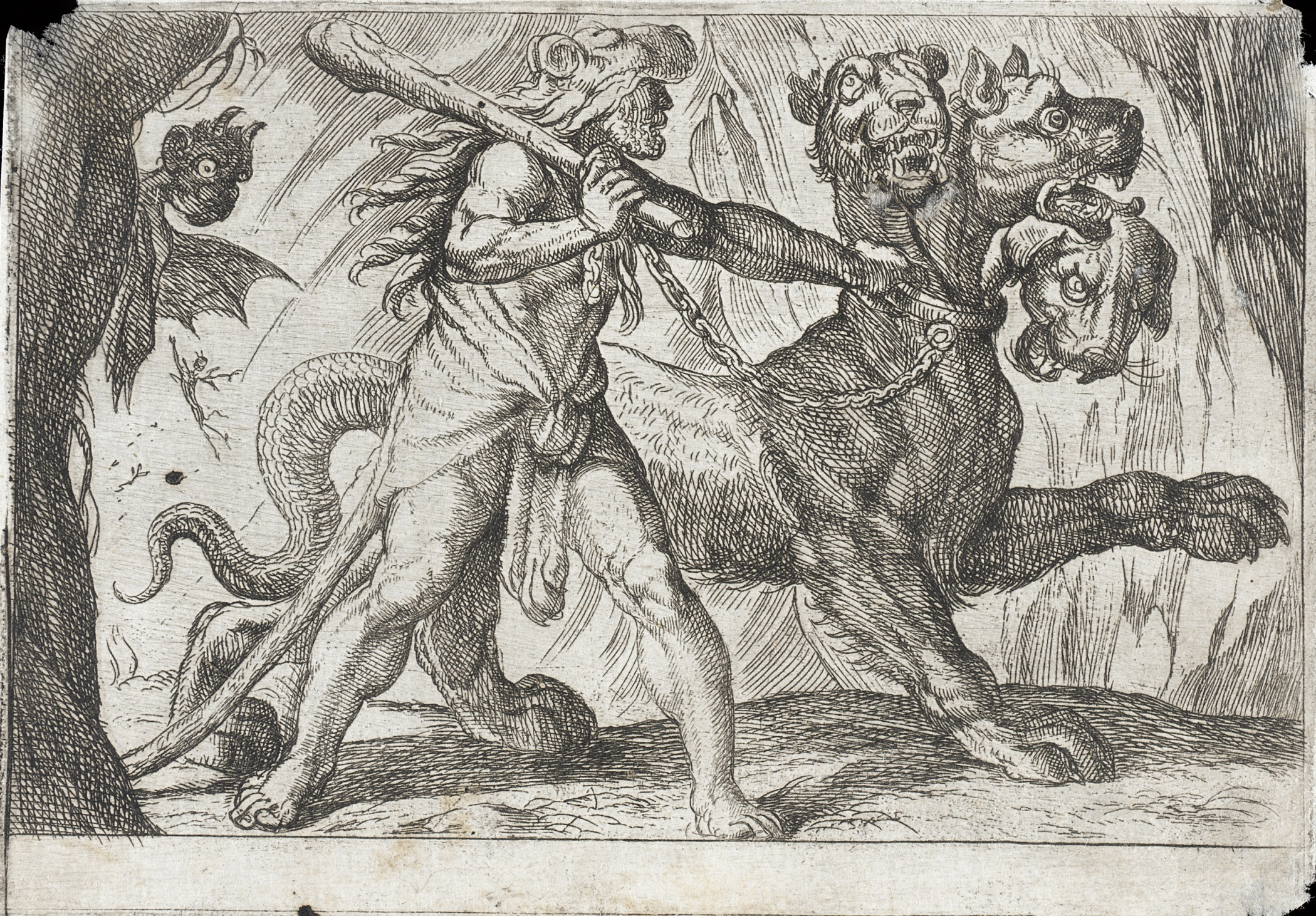
Cerberus and Heracles. Etching by Antonio Tempesta (Florence, Italy, 1555–1630). The Los Angeles County Museum of Art.

Seneca, in his tragedy Hercules Furens gives a detailed description of Cerberus and his capture. Seneca's Cerberus has three heads, a mane of snakes, and a snake tail, with his three heads being covered in gore, and licked by the many snakes which surround them, and with hearing so acute that he can hear "even ghosts". Seneca has Heracles use his lion-skin as shield, and his wooden club, to beat Cerberus into submission, after which Hades and Persephone, quailing on their thrones, let Heracles lead a chained and submissive Cerberus away. But upon leaving the underworld, at his first sight of daylight, a frightened Cerberus struggles furiously, and Heracles, with the help of Theseus (who had been held captive by Hades, but released, at Heracles' request) drag Cerberus into the light. Seneca, like Diodorus, has Heracles parade the captured Cerberus through Greece.

Apollodorus' Cerberus has three dog-heads, a serpent for a tail, and the heads of many snakes on his back. According to Apollodorus, Heracles' twelfth and final labor was to bring back Cerberus from Hades. Heracles first went to Eumolpus to be initiated into the Eleusinian Mysteries. Upon his entering the underworld, all the dead flee Heracles except for Meleager and the Gorgon Medusa. Heracles drew his sword against Medusa, but Hermes told Heracles that the dead are mere "empty phantoms". Heracles asked Hades (here called Pluto) for Cerberus, and Hades said that Heracles could take Cerberus provided he was able to subdue him without using weapons. Heracles found Cerberus at the gates of Acheron, and with his arms around Cerberus, though being bitten by Cerberus' serpent tail, Heracles squeezed until Cerberus submitted. Heracles carried Cerberus away, showed him to Eurystheus, then returned Cerberus to the underworld.

In an apparently unique version of the story, related by the sixth-century AD Pseudo-Nonnus, Heracles descended into Hades to abduct Persephone, and killed Cerberus on his way back up.

== Iconography ==
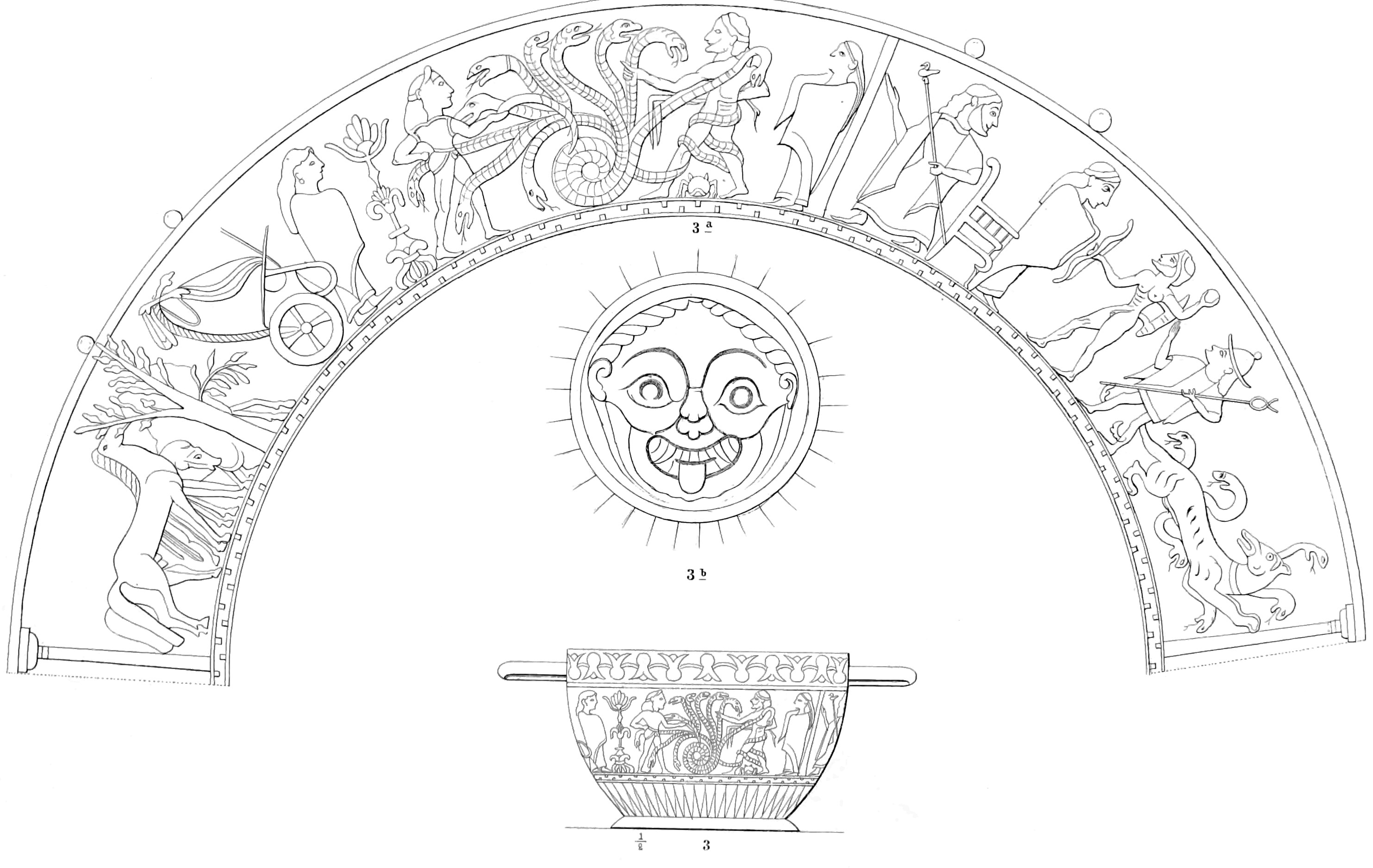
One of the two earliest depictions of the capture of Cerberus (composed of the last five figures on the right) shows, from right to left: Cerberus, with a single dog head and snakes rising from his body, fleeing right, Hermes, with his characteristic hat (petasos) and caduceus, Heracles, with quiver on his back, stone in left hand, and bow in right, a goddess, standing in front of Hades' throne, facing Heracles, and Hades, with scepter, fleeing left. Drawing of a lost Corinthian cup (c. 590–580 BC) from Argos.

The capture of Cerberus was a popular theme in ancient Greek and Roman art. The earliest depictions date from the beginning of the sixth century BC. One of the two earliest depictions, a Corinthian cup (c. 590–580 BC) from Argos (now lost), shows a naked Heracles, with quiver on his back and bow in his right hand, striding left, accompanied by Hermes. Heracles threatens Hades with a stone, who flees left, while a goddess, perhaps Persephone or possibly Athena, standing in front of Hades' throne, prevents the attack. Cerberus, with a single canine head and snakes rising from his head and body, flees right. On the far right a column indicates the entrance to Hades' palace. Many of the elements of this scene—Hermes, Athena, Hades, Persephone, and a column or portico—are common occurrences in later works. The other earliest depiction, a relief pithos fragment from Crete (c. 590–570 BC), is thought to show a single lion-headed Cerberus with a snake (open-mouthed) over his back being led to the right.

A mid-sixth-century BC Laconian cup by the Hunt Painter adds several new features to the scene which also become common in later works: three heads, a snake tail, Cerberus' chain and Heracles' club. Here Cerberus has three canine heads, is covered by a shaggy coat of snakes, and has a tail which ends in a snake head. He is being held on a chain leash by Heracles who holds his club raised over head.

In Greek art, the vast majority of depictions of Heracles and Cerberus occur on Attic vases. Although the lost Corinthian cup shows Cerberus with a single dog head, and the relief pithos fragment (c. 590–570 BC) apparently shows a single lion-headed Cerberus, in Attic vase painting Cerberus usually has two dog heads. In other art, as in the Laconian cup, Cerberus is usually three-headed. Occasionally in Roman art Cerberus is shown with a large central lion head and two smaller dog heads on either side.

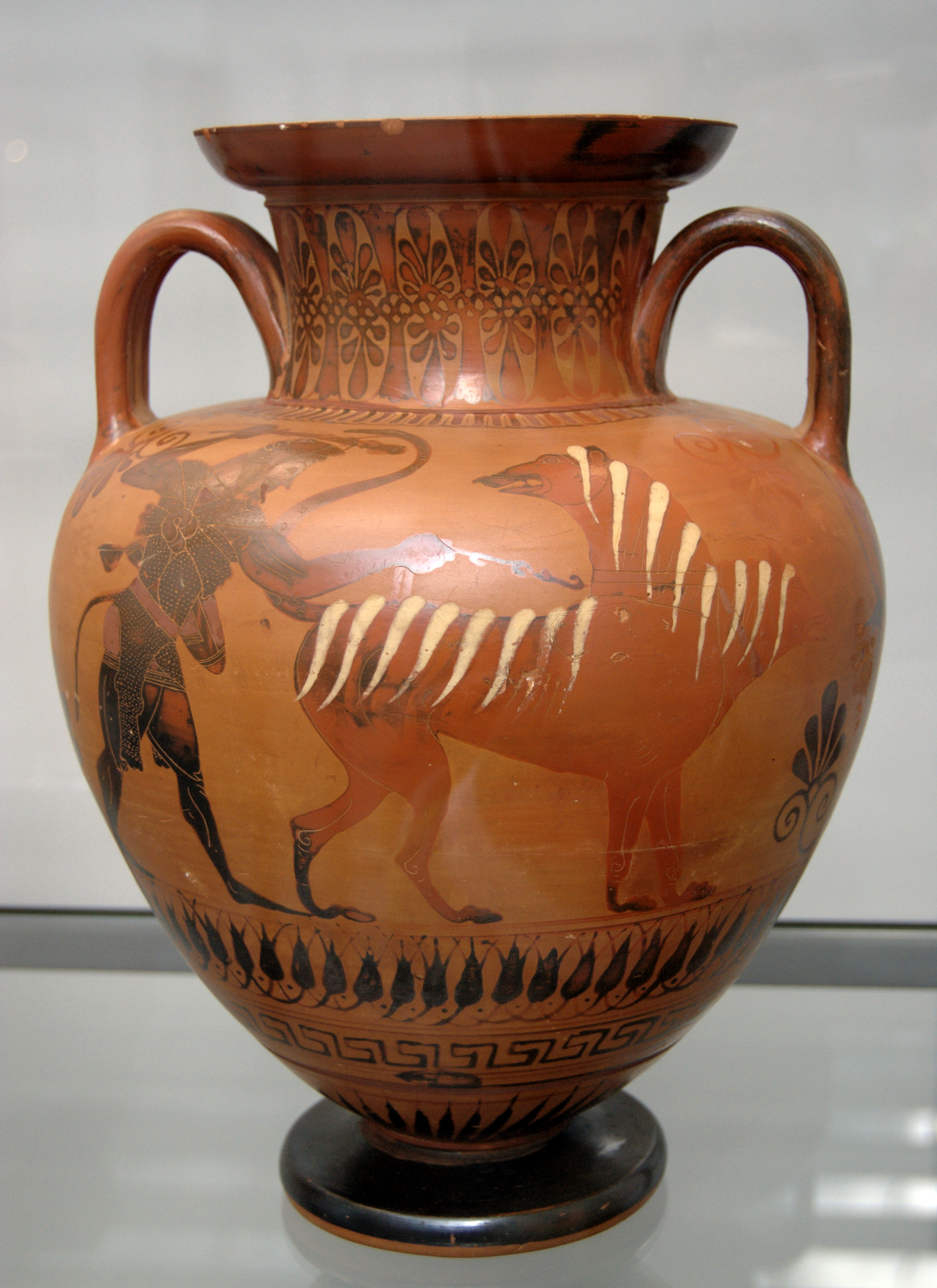
Heracles with club in his right hand raised over head and leash in left hand drives ahead of him a two-headed Cerberus with mane down his necks and back and a snake tail. A neck-amphora (c. 530–515 BC) from Vulci (Munich 1493).

As in the Corinthian and Laconian cups (and possibly the relief pithos fragment), Cerberus is often depicted as part snake. In Attic vase painting, Cerberus is usually shown with a snake for a tail or a tail which ends in the head of a snake. Snakes are also often shown rising from various parts of his body including snout, head, neck, back, ankles, and paws.

Two Attic amphoras from Vulci, one (c. 530–515 BC) by the Bucci Painter (Munich 1493), the other (c. 525–510 BC) by the Andokides painter (Louvre F204), in addition to the usual two heads and snake tail, show Cerberus with a mane down his necks and back, another typical Cerberian feature of Attic vase painting. Andokides' amphora also has a small snake curling up from each of Cerberus' two heads.

Besides this lion-like mane and the occasional lion-head mentioned above, Cerberus was sometimes shown with other leonine features. A pitcher (c. 530–500) shows Cerberus with mane and claws, while a first-century BC sardonyx cameo shows Cerberus with leonine body and paws. In addition, a limestone relief fragment from Taranto (c. 320–300 BC) shows Cerberus with three lion-like heads.

During the second quarter of the 5th century BC the capture of Cerberus disappears from Attic vase painting. After the early third century BC, the subject becomes rare everywhere until the Roman period. In Roman art the capture of Cerberus is usually shown together with other labors. Heracles and Cerberus are usually alone, with Heracles leading Cerberus.

== Cerberus rationalized ==
At least as early as the 6th century BC, some ancient writers attempted to explain away various fantastical features of Greek mythology; included in these are various rationalized accounts of the Cerberus story. The earliest such account (late 6th century BC) is that of Hecataeus of Miletus. In his account Cerberus was not a dog at all, but rather simply a large venomous snake, which lived on Tainaron. The serpent was called the "hound of Hades" only because anyone bitten by it died immediately, and it was this snake that Heracles brought to Eurystheus. The geographer Pausanias (who preserves for us Hecataeus' version of the story) points out that, since Homer does not describe Cerberus, Hecataeus' account does not necessarily conflict with Homer, since Homer's "Hound of Hades" may not in fact refer to an actual dog.

Other rationalized accounts make Cerberus out to be a normal dog. According to Palaephatus (4th century BC) Cerberus was one of the two dogs who guarded the cattle of Geryon, the other being Orthrus. Geryon lived in a city named Tricranium (in Greek Tricarenia, "Three-Heads"), from which name both Cerberus and Geryon came to be called "three-headed". Heracles killed Orthus, and drove away Geryon's cattle, with Cerberus following along behind. Molossus, a Mycenaen, offered to buy Cerberus from Eurystheus (presumably having received the dog, along with the cattle, from Heracles). But when Eurystheus refused, Molossus stole the dog and penned him up in a cave in Tainaron. Eurystheus commanded Heracles to find Cerberus and bring him back. After searching the entire Peloponnesus, Heracles found where it was said Cerberus was being held, went down into the cave, and brought up Cerberus, after which it was said: "Heracles descended through the cave into Hades and brought up Cerberus."

In the rationalized account of Philochorus, in which Heracles rescues Theseus, Perithous is eaten by Cerberus. In this version of the story, Aidoneus (i.e., "Hades") is the mortal king of the Molossians, with a wife named Persephone, a daughter named Kore (another name for the goddess Persephone) and a large mortal dog named Cerberus, with whom all suitors of his daughter were required to fight. After having stolen Helen, to be Theseus' wife, Theseus and Perithous, attempt to abduct Kore, for Perithous, but Aidoneus catches the two heroes, imprisons Theseus, and feeds Perithous to Cerberus. Later, while a guest of Aidoneus, Heracles asks Aidoneus to release Theseus, as a favor, which Aidoneus grants.

A 2nd-century AD Greek known as Heraclitus the paradoxographer (not to be confused with the 5th-century BC Greek philosopher Heraclitus)—claimed that Cerberus had two pups that were never away from their father, which made Cerberus appear to be three-headed.

== Cerberus allegorized ==
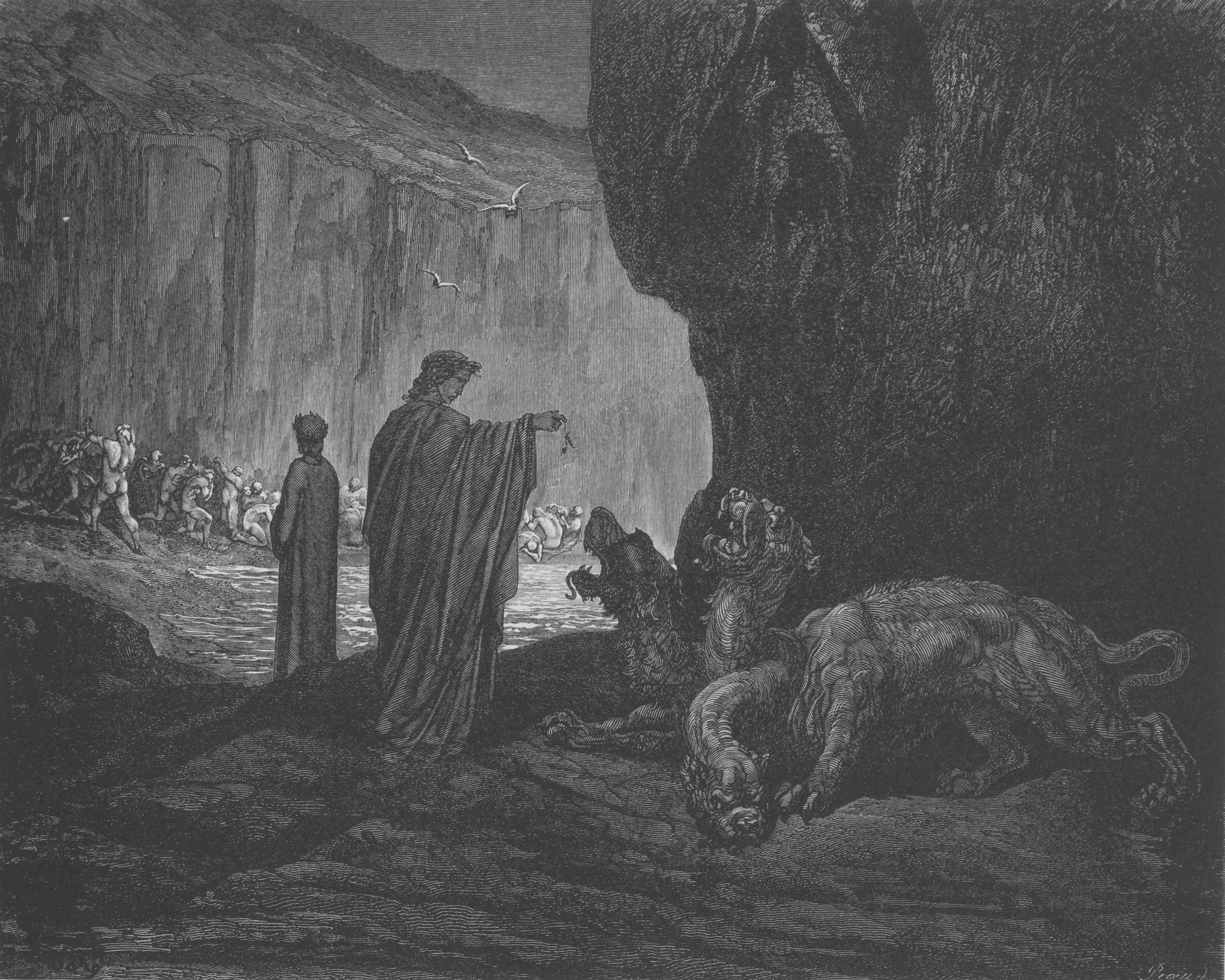
Virgil feeding Cerberus earth in the Third Circle of Hell. Illustration from Dante's Inferno by Gustave Doré.

Servius, a medieval commentator on Virgil's Aeneid, derived Cerberus' name from the Greek word creoboros meaning "flesh-devouring" (see above), and held that Cerberus symbolized the corpse-consuming earth, with Heracles' triumph over Cerberus representing his victory over earthly desires. Later, the mythographer Fulgentius, allegorizes Cerberus' three heads as representing the three origins of human strife: "nature, cause, and accident", and (drawing on the same flesh-devouring etymology as Servius) as symbolizing "the three ages—infancy, youth, old age, at which death enters the world." The Byzantine historian and bishop Eusebius wrote that Cerberus was represented with three heads, because the positions of the sun above the earth are three—rising, midday, and setting.

The later Vatican Mythographers repeat and expand upon the traditions of Servius and Fulgentius. All three Vatican Mythographers repeat Servius' derivation of Cerberus' name from creoboros. The Second Vatican Mythographer repeats (nearly word for word) what Fulgentius had to say about Cerberus, while the Third Vatican Mythographer, in another very similar passage to Fugentius', says (more specifically than Fugentius), that for "the philosophers" Cerberus represented hatred, his three heads symbolizing the three kinds of human hatred: natural, causal, and casual (i.e. accidental).

The Second and Third Vatican Mythographers, note that the three brothers Zeus, Poseidon and Hades each have tripartite insignia, associating Hades' three-headed Cerberus, with Zeus' three-forked thunderbolt, and Poseidon's three-pronged trident, while the Third Vatican Mythographer adds that "some philosophers think of Cerberus as the tripartite earth: Asia, Africa, and Europe. This earth, swallowing up bodies, sends souls to Tartarus."

Virgil described Cerberus as "ravenous" (fame rabida), and a rapacious Cerberus became proverbial. Thus Cerberus came to symbolize avarice, and so, for example, in Dante's Inferno, Cerberus is placed in the Third Circle of Hell, guarding over the gluttons, where he "rends the spirits, flays and quarters them," and Dante (perhaps echoing Servius' association of Cerberus with earth) has his guide Virgil take up handfuls of earth and throw them into Cerberus' "rapacious gullets."

== Namesakes ==
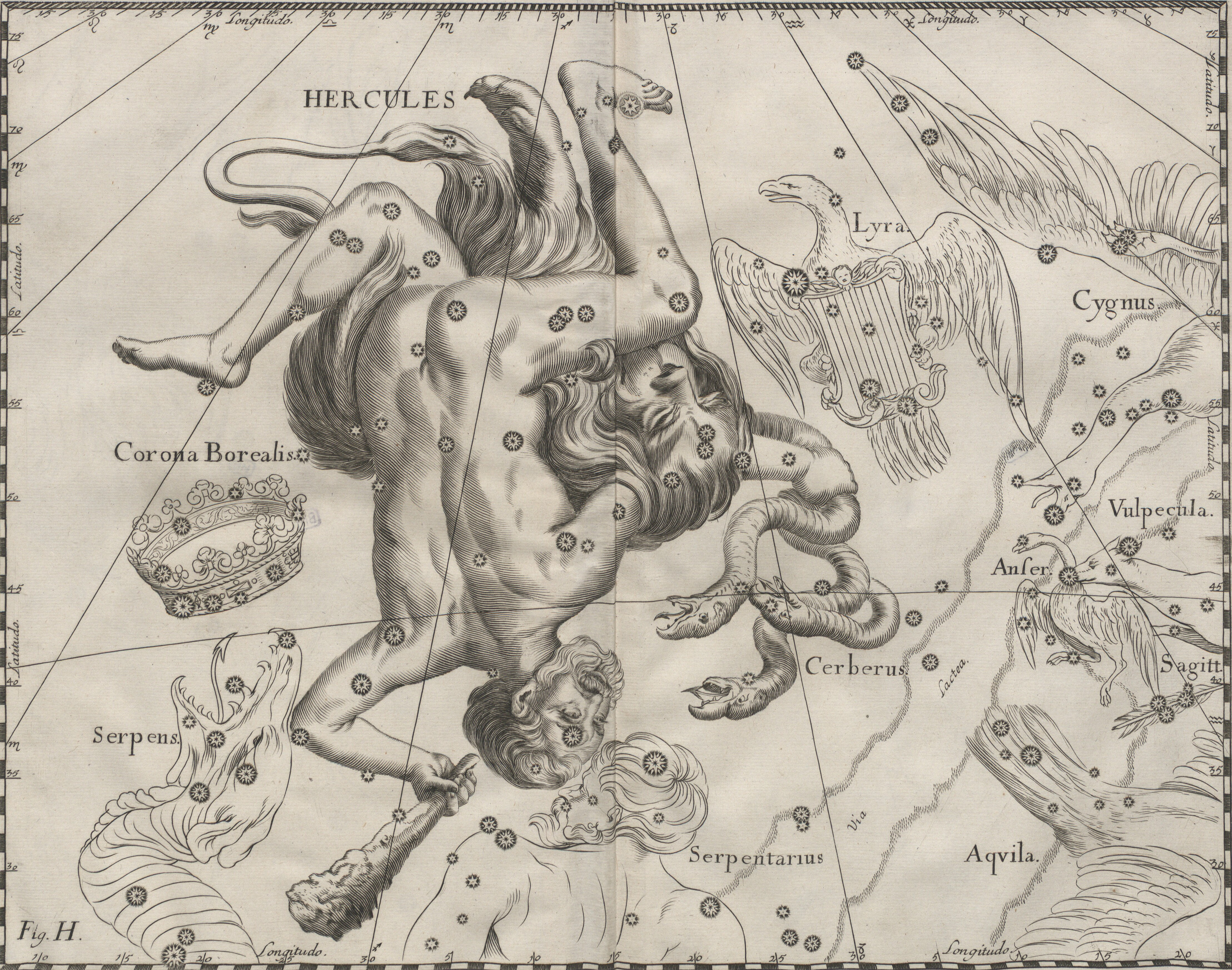
Cerberus constellation

In the constellation Cerberus introduced by Johannes Hevelius in 1687, Cerberus is drawn as a three-headed snake, held in Hercules' hand (previously these stars had been depicted as a branch of the tree on which grew the Apples of the Hesperides).

In 1829, French naturalist Georges Cuvier gave the name Cerberus to a genus of Asian snakes, which are commonly called "dog-faced water snakes" in English.

In 1988 the Massachusetts Institute of Technology (MIT) developed Kerberos, a computer-network authentication protocol, named after Cerberus.

Of the 2023 European heatwaves, the most significant was named the "Cerberus Heatwave", which brought the hottest temperatures ever recorded in Europe.

== See also ==
- Ammit, a chthonic creature in Egyptian mythology
- Cadejo
- Dormarch – part of the Cŵn Annwn
- Hellhound
- List of Greek mythological creatures
- Sharvara and Shyama of Hindu mythology
