= Franco Rami =

Argentine footballer

Personal information
- Full name: Franco Ezequiel Rami
- Date of birth: 31 March 2003 (age 23)
- Place of birth: Córdoba, Argentina
- Height: 1.92 m (6 ft 4 in)
- Position: Striker

Team information
- Current team: Ñublense (on loan from Belgrano)
- Number: 9

Youth career
- Belgrano

Senior career*
Years	Team	Apps	(Gls)
2024–	Belgrano	2	(0)
2025	→ Aldosivi (loan)	18	(3)
2026–	→ Ñublense (loan)	1	(0)
- * Club domestic league appearances and goals as of 2 February 2026

Franco Ezequiel Rami (born 31 March 2003) is an Argentine footballer who plays as a striker for Chilean Primera División club Ñublense on loan from Belgrano.

== Club career ==
Born in Córdoba, Argentina, Rami is a product of Belgrano. He made his professional debut in the 1–0 win against Claypole on 3 August 2023 for the Copa Argentina. The next year, he made his debut in the Copa de la Liga Profesional in the 0–4 loss against Racing Club on 16 April. In 2025, Rami was loaned out to Aldosivi.

In January 2026, Rami moved abroad and joined Chilean Primera División club Ñublense on loan.

== Personal life ==
Franco is the son of the former footballer Cristian Rami. In 2022, they faced each other in a friendly match with Cristian playing for Sportivo Colonia Tirolesa and Franco for the Belgrano reserve team.
