= 102 Herculis =

Star in the constellation Hercules

- Location of 102 Herculis (circled in red)

Observation data Epoch J2000 Equinox J2000
- Constellation: Hercules
- Right ascension: 18^{h} 08^{m} 45.49142^{s}
- Declination: +20° 48′ 52.4079″
- Apparent magnitude (V): 4.37

Characteristics
- Spectral type: B2 IV or B2 V
- B−V color index: −0.164±0.013

Astrometry
Radial velocity (R_{v})	−14.9±0.6 km/s
Proper motion (μ)	RA: −1.92 mas/yr Dec.: −5.89 mas/yr
Parallax (π)	3.56±0.19 mas
Distance	920 ± 50 ly (280 ± 10 pc)
Absolute magnitude (M_{V})	−2.87

Details
Mass	9.7±0.2 M_{☉}
Luminosity	3,631.92 L_{☉}
Surface gravity (log g)	3.54 cgs
Temperature	22,420±1,440 K
Rotational velocity (v sin i)	41 km/s
Age	20.0±1.4 Myr

Other designations
- Ramus, 102 Her, BD+20°3674, FK5 3443, HD 166182, HIP 88886, HR 6787, SAO 85769, WDS J18088+2049

Database references
SIMBAD	data

102 Herculis, also named Ramus, is a single star in the northern constellation of Hercules. It is visible to the naked eye as a faint, blue-white hued star with an apparent visual magnitude of 4.37. Based upon parallax measurements, it is located around 920 light years away from the Sun. The star is moving closer to the Earth with a heliocentric radial velocity of −15 km/s.

The stellar classification of this object matches a massive, early B-type star with a luminosity class of IV or V, corresponding to a subgiant or main sequence star, respectively. It is 20 million years old with nearly ten times the mass of the Sun and is spinning with a projected rotational velocity of 41 km/s. The strength of the stellar magnetic field has been measured at (209.5±135.4)×10^{−4} T. The star is radiating 3,632 times the Sun's luminosity from its photosphere at an effective temperature of 22,420 K.

== Etymology ==
In Chinese, 帛度 (Bó Dù), meaning Textile Ruler, refers to an asterism consisting of 102 Herculis and 95 Herculis. Consequently, 102 Herculis itself is known as 帛度二 (Bó Dù èr, English: the Second Star of Textile Ruler.)

This star, together with 93 Herculis, 95 Herculis, and 109 Herculis, formed the now obsolete constellation of Cerberus, which was sometimes combined with Ramus, the apple branch. The IAU Working Group on Star Names approved the name Ramus for 102 Herculis on 17 June 2025 and it is now so entered in the IAU Catalog of Star Names. The WGSN avoided using the name Cerberus since it was already in use for the asteroid 1865 Cerberus.
