= Third circle of hell =

Part of the Divine Comedy

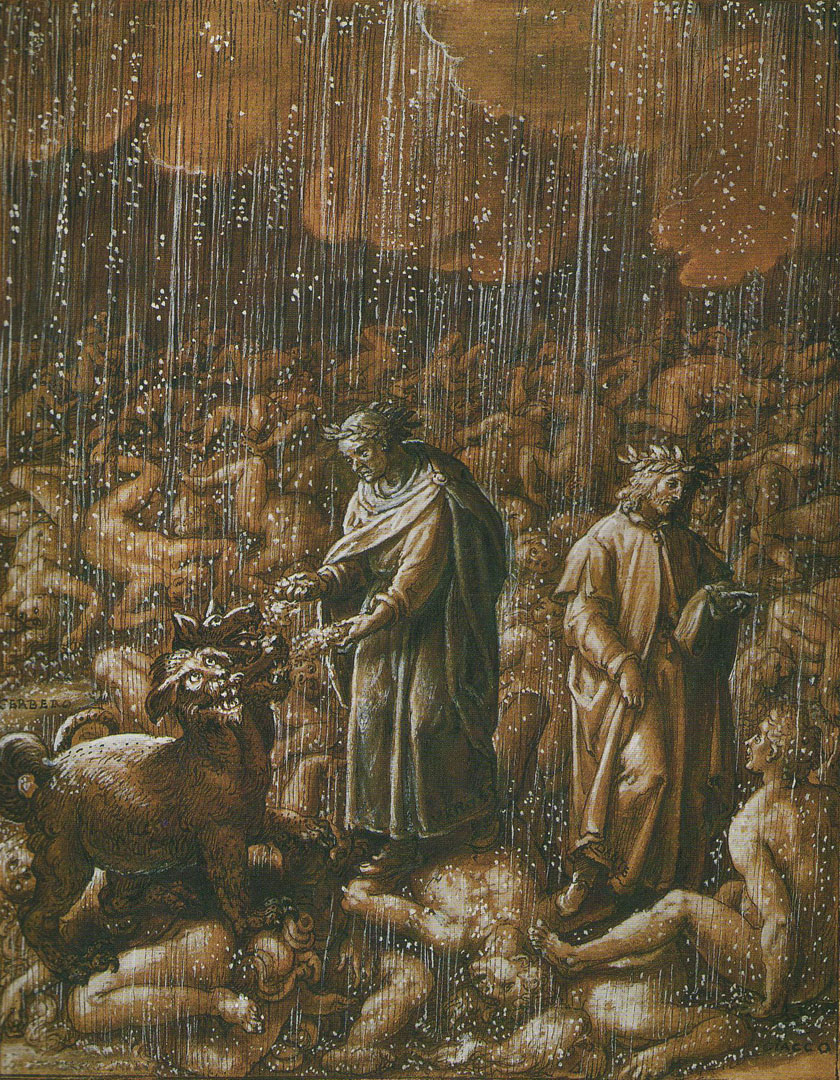
Amid the rain, Dante and Virgil encounter Cerberus, as illustrated by Stradanus

The third circle of hell is depicted in Dante Alighieri's Inferno, the first part of the 14th-century poem Divine Comedy. Inferno tells the story of Dante's journey through a vision of the Christian hell ordered into nine circles corresponding to classifications of sin; the third circle represents the sin of gluttony, where the souls of the gluttonous are punished in a realm of icy mud.

Within the third circle, Dante encounters a man named Ciacco, with whom he discusses the contemporary strife between the Guelphs and Ghibellines in Florence; the circle is also inhabited by the three-headed hound Cerberus, who torments sinners by rending them apart.

Rather than focussing on the contrapasso punishment of the damned, Dante's depiction of the third circle of hell uses the figure of Ciacco—whose historicity is disputed—to explore the politics of Florence, which had previously led to the author being exiled from the city under pain of death. As such, the poem draws a parallel between gluttony and the thirst for power.

== Synopsis ==
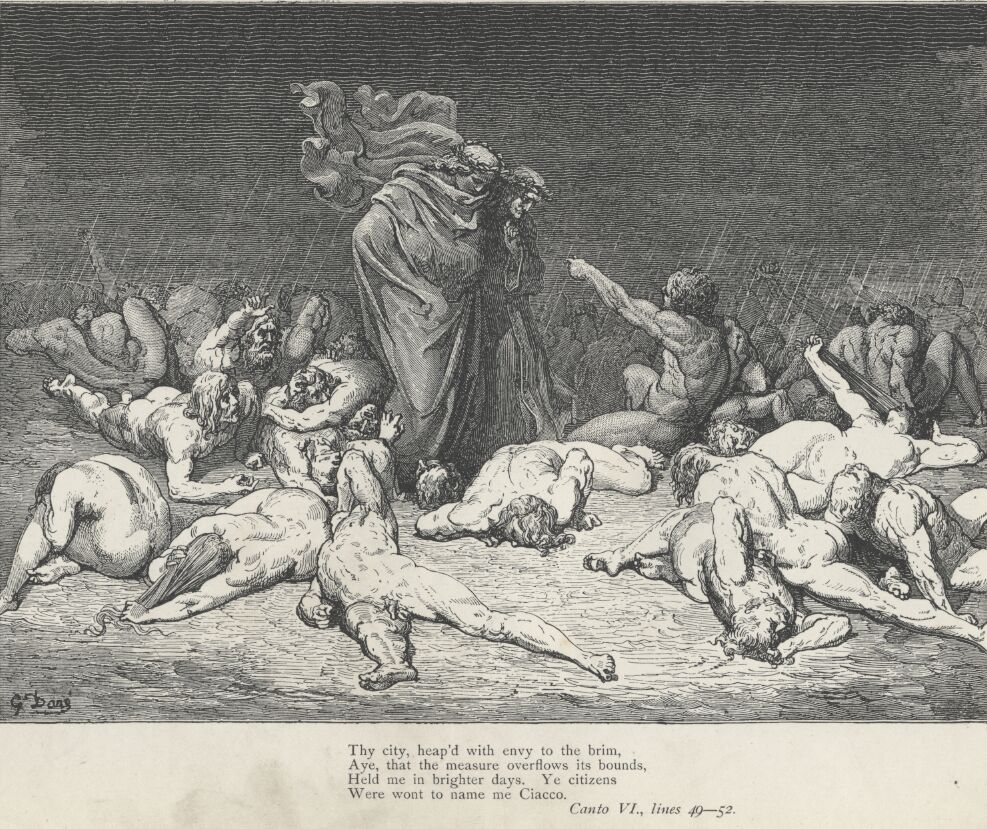
Ciacco speaks to Dante about Florentine strife, in an engraving by Gustav Doré

Inferno is the first section of Dante Alighieri's three-part poem Commedia, often known as the Divine Comedy. Written in the early 14th century, the work's three sections depict Dante being guided through the Christian concepts of hell (Inferno), purgatory (Purgatorio), and heaven (Paradiso). Inferno depicts a vision of hell divided into nine concentric circles, each home to souls guilty of a particular class of sin.

Led by his guide, the Roman poet Virgil, Dante enters the third circle of hell in Inferno's Canto VI. Dante awakens from having fainted in the second circle of hell, and sees that the third circle is beset by a torrent of icy hail and rain, putrefying the ground. The three-headed dog Cerberus approaches and is silenced by Virgil, who feeds it several handfuls of the thick mud that makes up the ground. Cerberus serves as a tormentor in this circle; tearing apart the damned and constantly bellowing in hunger.

Dante and Virgil walk further through the third circle, stepping upon the prostrate bodies of the gluttonous, who are being punished by lying face-first in the icy mud, left blind and unfulfilled. One soul greets the pair, identifying himself as Ciacco, a native of Florence. Ciacco and Dante discuss the political strife between the Guelph and Ghibelline factions in the city, with Ciacco offering a prophecy that each party will briefly hold control of Florence. Ciacco asks Dante to speak kindly of him when he returns to the mortal world. As Dante and Virgil leave the circle, Virgil explains that the punishments for sinners in hell will grow more severe after the Last Judgment.

== Background ==
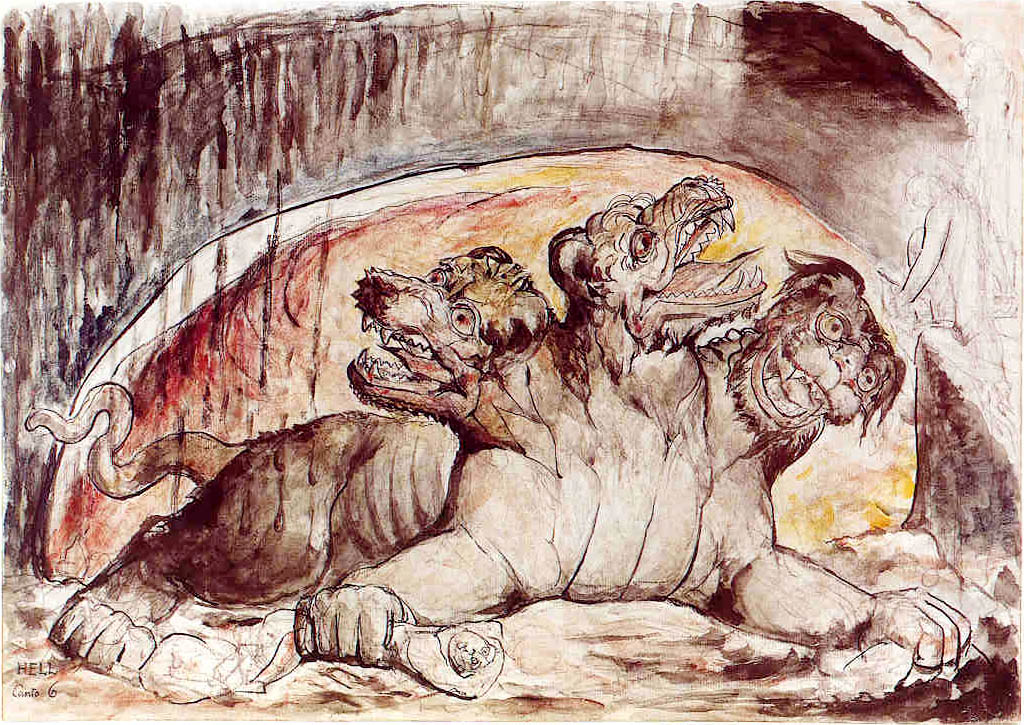
Cerberus in the third circle of hell, as depicted by William Blake

The presence of Cerberus in the third circle of hell is another instance of an ancient Greek mythological figure adapted and intensified by Dante; as with Charon and Minos in previous cantos, Cerberus is a figure associated with the Greek underworld in the works of Virgil and Ovid who has been repurposed for its appearance in the Commedia. Virgil quieting Cerberus with mouthfuls of dirt is an allusion to Virgil's Aeneid, where the hound is similarly silenced with honey cakes.

It is not known whether the man named Ciacco actually existed or was invented by Dante. His name has been read as a play on the word for "pig" (ciacco), although the tone with which Dante addresses him indicates that it may be a proper name and not mockery. Giovanni Boccaccio, another writer from Dante's home town of Florence, also uses the character in The Decameron, although it is not clear if this is based on the Inferno or on shared familiarity with a historical figure.

Dante's conversation with Ciacco is used to recount the strife between the Guelph and Ghibelline factions who had been vying for control of Florence during Dante's lifetime; the Commedia was written while Dante was exiled from the city having been sentenced to death in absentia. By the time of Dante's exile, the Guelphs, who had supported the influence of the papacy in Italy over the Ghibelline preference for the Holy Roman Emperor, had splintered into "white" and "black" factions divided over support for pope Boniface VIII. The white Guelphs, to which Dante belonged, favoured Florentine autonomy and opposed Boniface; their initial control of the city was ended when the black Guelphs, aided by papal troops, regained the city in 1301.

== Analysis ==
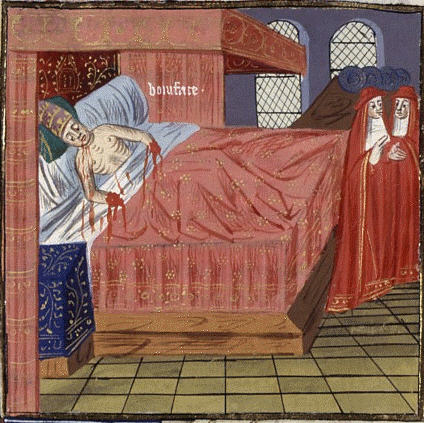
The Guelphs of Florence were divided over support for Boniface VIII (illustrated); this strife is the focus of Inferno's canto VI.

Dante's depiction of hell is one of order, unlike contemporary representations which, according to scholar Robin Kirkpatrick, were "pictured as chaos, violence and ugliness". Kirkpatrick draws a contrast between Dante's poetry and the frescoes of Giotto in Padua's Scrovegni Chapel. Dante's orderly hell is a representation of the structured universe created by God, one which forces its sinners to use "intelligence and understanding" to contemplate their purpose. The nine-fold subdivision of hell is influenced by the Ptolemaic model of cosmology, which similarly divided the universe into nine concentric spheres.

The third circle of hell sees the use of contrapasso, a theme throughout the Divine Comedy. Derived from the Latin contra ("in return") and pati ("to suffer"), contrapasso is the concept of suffering in the afterlife being a reflection of the sins committed in life. This notion derives both from biblical sources such as the books of Deuteronomy and Leviticus, as well the classical writers Virgil and Seneca the Younger; Seneca's Hercules Furens expresses the notion that "quod quisque fecit patitur", or "what each has done, he suffers". In the third circle, the warm comforts of gluttony are punished with icy sleet, where sinners howl like hungry dogs; the mud and slime is a reflection of their excess.

Dante uses the third circle of hell to discuss contemporary politics; although there is no clear political link to the sin of gluttony, Dante compares the city of Florence to an overfed stomach, "so full of envy" that it overflows. Unn Falkeid, in her book The Avignon Papacy Contested: An Intellectual History from Dante to Catherine of Siena, notes that the canto focusses on the "unslakable thirst for power" rather than the "food, drinks, and bodily desires" expected of Epicurean gluttony. Falkeid also draws a comparison between the factions of the "divided city" of Florence and the torn bodies left by Cerberus in this canto, "with the effect of dismissing [...] any attempt to gather them into a harmonic unity".

== Footnotes ==
=== References ===
- Alighieri, Dante (1998). Albertini, Stefano (ed.). Inferno. Wordsworth Editions. ISBN 978-1-853-26787-1.
- Alighieri, Dante (2013). Kirkpatrick, Robin (ed.). Inferno. Penguin Classics. ISBN 978-0-141-39354-4.
- Falkeid, Unn (2017). The Avignon Papacy Contested: An Intellectual History from Dante to Catherine of Siena. Harvard University Press. ISBN 978-0-674-97184-4.
- Fowlie, Wallace (1981). A Reading of Dante's Inferno. University of Chicago Press. ISBN 978-0-226-25888-1.
- Honess, Claire E (2015). "Divided City, Slavish Italy, Universal Empire". Vertical Readings in Dante's Comedy. pp. 119–142. in Corbett & Webb (2015)
- Lansing, Richard, ed. (2010). The Dante Encyclopaedia. Taylor & Francis. ISBN 978-1-136-84972-5.
- Corbett, George; Webb, Heather Mariah, eds. (2015). Vertical Readings in Dante's Comedy. Open Book Publishers. ISBN 978-1-78374-172-4.
- Musa, Mark, ed. (1995). Dante's Inferno: The Indiana Critical Edition. Indiana University Press. ISBN 978-0-253-01240-1.
