= Ciacco =

Character in Dante's Inferno

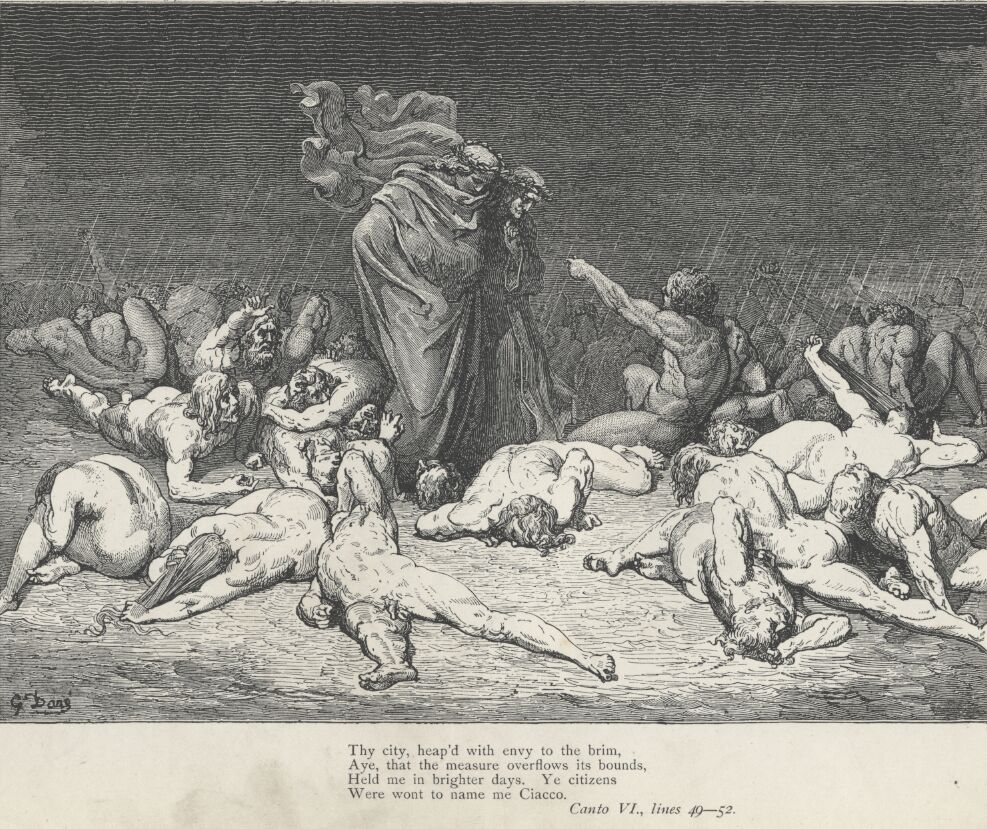
Dante meets Ciacco. Engraving by Gustave Doré

Ciacco ([ˈtʃakko]) is a key character in the third circle of hell in the Divine Comedy by Dante Alighieri that was not yet well defined by historians. This is how he presents himself to Dante when he is in Hell:

"Voi cittadini mi chiamaste Ciacco;
per la dannosa colpa de la gola,
come tu vedi, a la pioggia mi fiacco."

—Dante Alighieri. Inferno, VI, 52–54 (1321)

"Ye citizens were wont to call me Ciacco;
For the pernicious sin of gluttony,
I, as thou seest, am battered by this rain."

—Henry Wadsworth Longfellow (1867)

This way introducing himself allows us to interpret it in various ways, but one of the oldest commentators of the Comedy suggests a derogatory nature of this name: "Ciacco is said to be a pig's name, hence he was called this way for his gluttony."

Giovanni Boccaccio makes of Ciacco eighth story of the ninth day of the Decameron, describing him as "the most gluttonous fellow that ever lived." However, the reference to Ciacco's name is somewhat ambiguous: he is referred to as the man "whom everyone called Ciacco." It is hard to say if Boccaccio had sources for his writings aside from Dante, because this name has not been found in literature before Dante. According to Vittorio Sermonti, a scholar dedicated to the study of the Comedy, the hypothesis that this Ciacco is the poet Ciacco dell'Anguillara is not true.
