= Ramy =

Ramy is a masculine given name which may refer to:

- Ramy Akiki (born 1982), Lebanese basketball player
- Ramy Ashour (born 1987), Egyptian retired squash player
- Ramy Ayach (born 1980), Lebanese singer
- Ramy Bensebaini (born 1995), Algerian footballer
- Ramy Ditzanny (born 1950), Israeli poet
- Ramy Essam (born 1987), Egyptian musician
- Ramy Imam (born 1974), Egyptian director, actor and producer
- Ramy Rabia (born 1993), Egyptian footballer
- Ramy Rabie (born 1982), Egyptian former footballer
- Ramy Romany, Egyptologist and documentary maker
- Ramy Youssef (born 1991), American stand-up comedian, actor and writer
- Big Ramy (Mamdouh Elssbiay, born 1984), Egyptian bodybuilder and Mr. Olympia champion

Ramy may also refer to Ramy (TV series), a 2019 American comedy-drama television series starring Ramy Youssef
