= Ramus Pomifer =

Former constellation

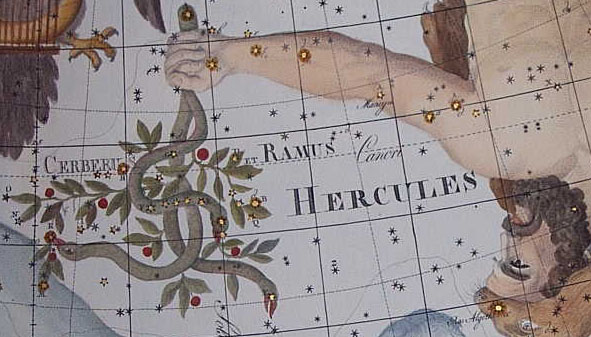
Representation of the constellation

Ramus Pomifer (Latin for apple branch) was a constellation between Hercules and Lyra.

It was depicted in the form of a branch held in Hercules' left hand. The also-obsolete constellation of Cerberus - made up of much the same stars - became combined with it in later depictions, with the name "Cerberus et Ramus".

The IAU Working Group on Star Names approved the name Ramus for the star 102 Herculis in 2025, after the obsolete constellation.

== See also ==
- Former constellations
