= Sybla Ramus =

American musician and writer (1874–1963)

- Born: October 3, 1874; Virginia, U.S.
- Died: January 1963 (aged 88)
- Occupation(s): Musician, music educator, writer

Sybla Ramus (October 3, 1874 – January 1963) was an American musician, music educator, and writer. She wrote fiction, plays, and a libretto for an opera.

== Early life and education ==
Ramus was born in Virginia, the daughter of Charles Emil Ramus and Sybla Faulds Ramus. Her father was born in Denmark and her mother was born in Canada. Her brother Carl Ramus became a prominent physician. She studied music with Madame Neilson Rounseville in Chicago, Max Bendix in New York, Arno Hilf in Leipzig, and Otakar Ševčík in Prague.

== Career ==
Ramus performed as a violinist and a pianist in Europe and the United States. She and her brother gave a joint piano recital in Chicago in 1886, when she was twelve. In 1888, she played at Kimball Hall, and the Chicago Tribune described her and Augusta Cottlow as "two remarkably talented children". She gave a well-reviewed piano concert in Chicago in December 1889. She played viola in the St. James Orchestra in Chicago in 1894. In 1905, she was called "one of the finest violinists in Honolulu." In 1934 she was soloist at a free concert at the Brooklyn Museum.

== Works ==
In the 1920s, Ramus wrote an opera libretto, two plays, and a serialized novel. In the 1930s, she summarized European publications for the journal of the American Society for Psychical Research. In the 1940s, she arranged music.

- "The Land of Bye and Bye" (1920, a song by Francis Whiting Hatch, arranged by Ramus)
- Armand (1921, an opera libretto, with music by Gerard Carbonara)
- Dishonored (1923, a four-act play)
- Her Girl Friend (1923, a three-act play)
- Coils of Darkness (1924, serialized novel, Weird Tales)
- "The Continental Journals" (1931, Psychic Research)
- "In the Bamboo Forest" (1946, arranged by Ramus)
- "Melodie" (1945, a composition for violin and piano)
- "Serenata" (1945, composed by F. Paolo Tosti, arranged by Ramus)
- "Dream Girl", "The Evening Star's Story", "A Lovely Song", "The Song of the Bells", "Chaser", "Rolling, Rolling", "Stand by Your Country", "Venezuela", and "A Song of the Sea" (1945, songs by Margaret Beatrice Shelford, arranged by Ramus)
- "Desert Echoes", "Mrs. Dooley's Cat", "My Love is a Rose", "The Song of My Soul", and "Tenderness" (1947, songs by Margaret Beatrice Shelford, arranged by Ramus)
- "Lullaby-loo" (1948, arranged by Ramus)
- Violin in a Nutshell for Beginners (1954, arranger, with Elena de Sayn)
