= Cristian Rami =

Argentine footballer

Personal information
- Full name: Cristian Alberto Rami
- Date of birth: 26 January 1980 (age 46)
- Place of birth: Córdoba, Argentina
- Position: Forward

Senior career*
| Years | Team | Apps | (Gls) |
| 1999–2000 | Talleres de Córdoba | | |
| 2000–2001 | Atlético Tucumán | | |
| 2001–2002 | Talleres de Córdoba | | |
| 2002–2004 | Racing de Córdoba club5= Club Atletico Ascasubi | | |
| 2005 | Angers | 13 | (0) |
| 2005–2007 | Unión | | |
| 2007–2008 | Tiro Federal | | |
| 2008–2010 | Olympiacos Volos | 1 | (0) |
| 2010–2016 | Racing de Córdoba | | |
- * Club domestic league appearances and goals as of 2 February 2009

Cristian Alberto Rami (born 26 January 1980) is an Argentine footballer who holds an Italian passport and plays for Olympiacos Volos in the Greek Beta Ethniki.

== Club career ==
Rami previously played for Talleres de Córdoba in the Primera División de Argentina and Angers in the French Ligue 2. (Note: Cristian Rami – French league stats at LFP – also available in French (archived))
