= Cerberus (constellation) =

Former constellation

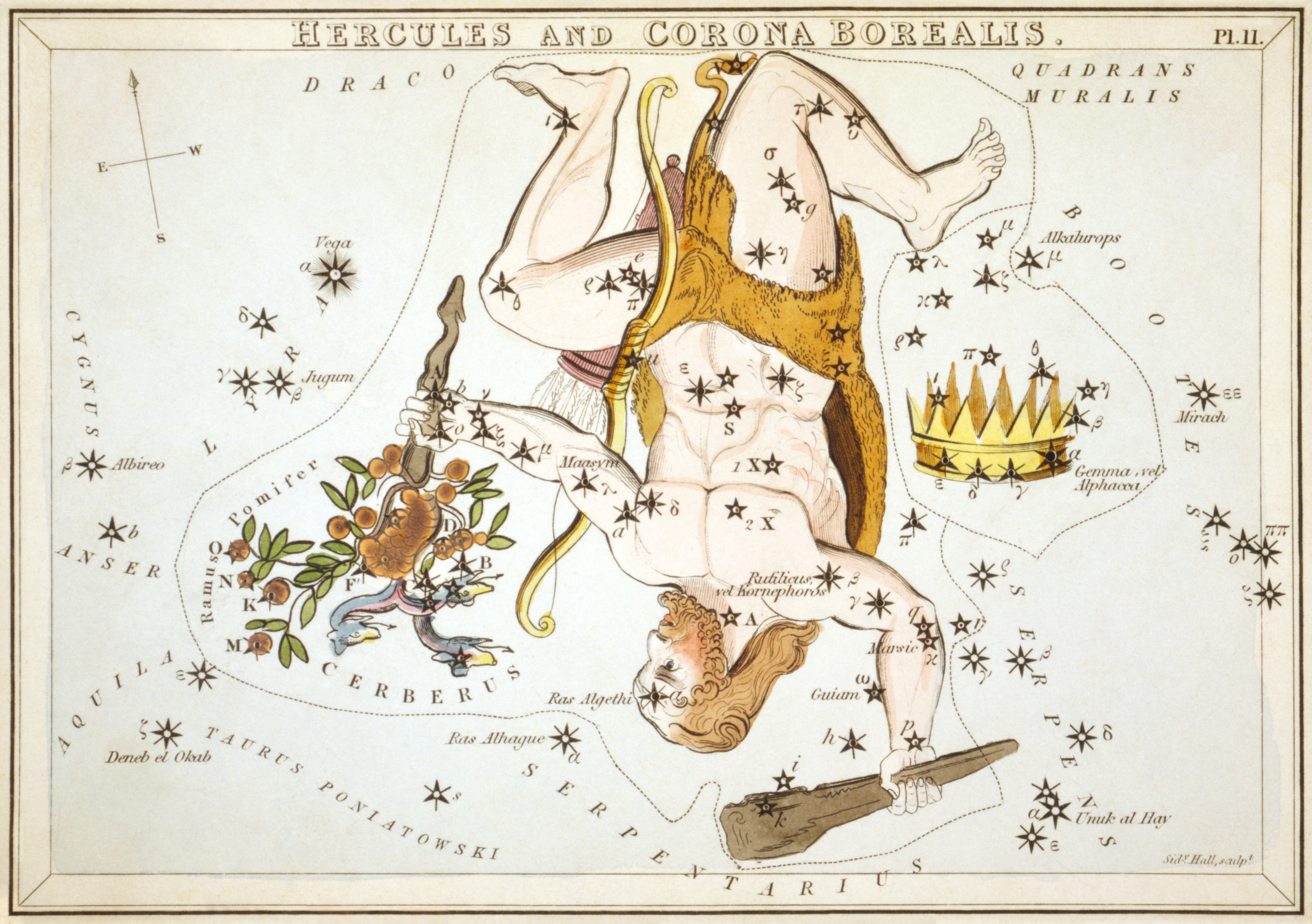
The "Cerberus et Ramus" combination of Cerberus and Ramus Pomifer can be seen in this plate from Urania's Mirror (c. 1825).

Cerberus is an obsolete constellation created by Hevelius in the 17th century, whose stars are now included in the constellation Hercules. It was depicted as a three-headed snake that Hercules is holding in his hand. The constellation is no longer in use. This constellation "figure typified the serpent ... infesting the country around Taenarum the Μέτωπον of Greece, the modern Cape Matapan." The presence of Cerberus (Kerberos) at Taenarum (Tainaron) is mentioned by Strabo, Statius, and Seneca the Younger. John Senex combined this constellation with the likewise obsolete constellation Ramus Pomifer, an apple branch held by Hercules, in his 1721 star map to create "Cerberus et Ramus".

== See also ==
- Former constellations
