= Musca in Chinese astronomy =

The modern constellation Musca is not included in the Three Enclosures and Twenty-Eight Mansions system of traditional Chinese uranography because its stars are too far south for observers in China to know about them prior to the introduction of Western star charts. Based on the work of Xu Guangqi and the German Jesuit missionary Johann Adam Schall von Bell in the late Ming Dynasty, this constellation has been classified under the 23 Southern Asterisms (近南極星區, Jìnnánjíxīngōu) with the names Bee (蜜蜂, Mìfēng) and Sea and Mountain (海山, Hǎishān).

The name of the western constellation in modern Chinese is 苍蝇座 (cāng ying zuò), meaning "the housefly constellation".

== Stars ==
The map of Chinese constellation in constellation Musca area consists of:

Four Symbols	Mansion (Chinese name)	Romanization	Translation	Asterisms (Chinese name)	Romanization	Translation	Western star name	Chinese star name	Romanization	Translation
-	近南極星區 (non-mansions)	Jìnnánjíxīngōu (non-mansions)	The Southern Asterisms (non-mansions)	蜜蜂	Mìfēng	Bee				
-	近南極星區 (non-mansions)	Jìnnánjíxīngōu (non-mansions)	The Southern Asterisms (non-mansions)	蜜蜂	Mìfēng	Bee	β Mus	蜜蜂一	Mìfēngyī	1st star
-	近南極星區 (non-mansions)	Jìnnánjíxīngōu (non-mansions)	The Southern Asterisms (non-mansions)	蜜蜂	Mìfēng	Bee	α Mus	蜜蜂二	Mìfēngèr	2nd star
-	近南極星區 (non-mansions)	Jìnnánjíxīngōu (non-mansions)	The Southern Asterisms (non-mansions)	蜜蜂	Mìfēng	Bee	δ Mus	蜜蜂四	Mìfēngsì	4th star
-	近南極星區 (non-mansions)	Jìnnánjíxīngōu (non-mansions)	The Southern Asterisms (non-mansions)	海山	Hǎishān	Sea and Mountain	λ Mus	海山六	Hǎishānliù	6th star

== See also ==
- Chinese astronomy
- Traditional Chinese star names
- Chinese constellations
