= Zeta Muscae =

The Bayer designation ζ Muscae (Zeta Muscae, ζ Mus) is shared by two stars in the constellation Musca:

- ζ^{1} Muscae
- ζ^{2} Muscae

Located 2.6° to the west of Beta Muscae, the pair are described as, "a soft creamy coloured primary with a pale orange companion".
