= Zeta1 Muscae =

Star in the constellation Musca

Zeta^{1} Muscae
- Location of ζ^{1} Muscae (circled in red)

Observation data Epoch J2000.0 Equinox J2000.0 (ICRS)
- Constellation: Musca
- Right ascension: 12^{h} 22^{m} 12.02893^{s}
- Declination: −68° 18′ 26.4093″
- Apparent magnitude (V): 5.73

Characteristics
- Evolutionary stage: Red-giant branch
- Spectral type: K0III
- B−V color index: +1.038±0.004

Astrometry
Radial velocity (R_{v})	+21.13±0.40 km/s
Proper motion (μ)	RA: −1.467 mas/yr Dec.: −47.437 mas/yr
Parallax (π)	9.1234±0.2059 mas
Distance	357 ± 8 ly (110 ± 2 pc)
Absolute magnitude (M_{V})	0.73

Details
Mass	2.80 M_{☉}
Radius	12.1 or 14.1 R_{☉}
Luminosity	82 L_{☉}
Surface gravity (log g)	2.531 cgs
Temperature	5,000 K
Metallicity [Fe/H]	−0.21 dex
Rotational velocity (v sin i)	3.92 km/s
Age	456 Myr

Other designations
- ζ^{1} Mus, CPD−67°1939, HD 107567, HIP 60329, HR 4704, SAO 251868

Database references
SIMBAD	data

Zeta^{1} Muscae, Latinized from ζ^{1} Muscae and abbreviated ζ^{1} Mus, is a suspected astrometric binary star system in the constellation Musca, located 2.6° west of Beta Muscae. It is bright enough to be visible to the naked eye as a dim, orange-hued star with an apparent visual magnitude of 5.73, forming a visual pair with nearby Zeta^{2} Muscae. The ζ^{1} Mus system is around 417 light-years distant from the Sun, based on parallax, and is drifting further away with a radial velocity of +21 km/s.

The suspected astrometric component of the ζ^{1} Mus system was identified from acceleration behavior in the proper motion of the main star. The visible component is an aging giant star with a stellar classification of K0III; a star that has used up its core hydrogen and is cooling and expanding. It now has 12 or 14 times the radius of the Sun and is radiating 82 times the Sun's luminosity from its swollen photosphere at an effective temperature of 5,000 K.
