= NGC 4815 =

Open cluster in the constellation Musca

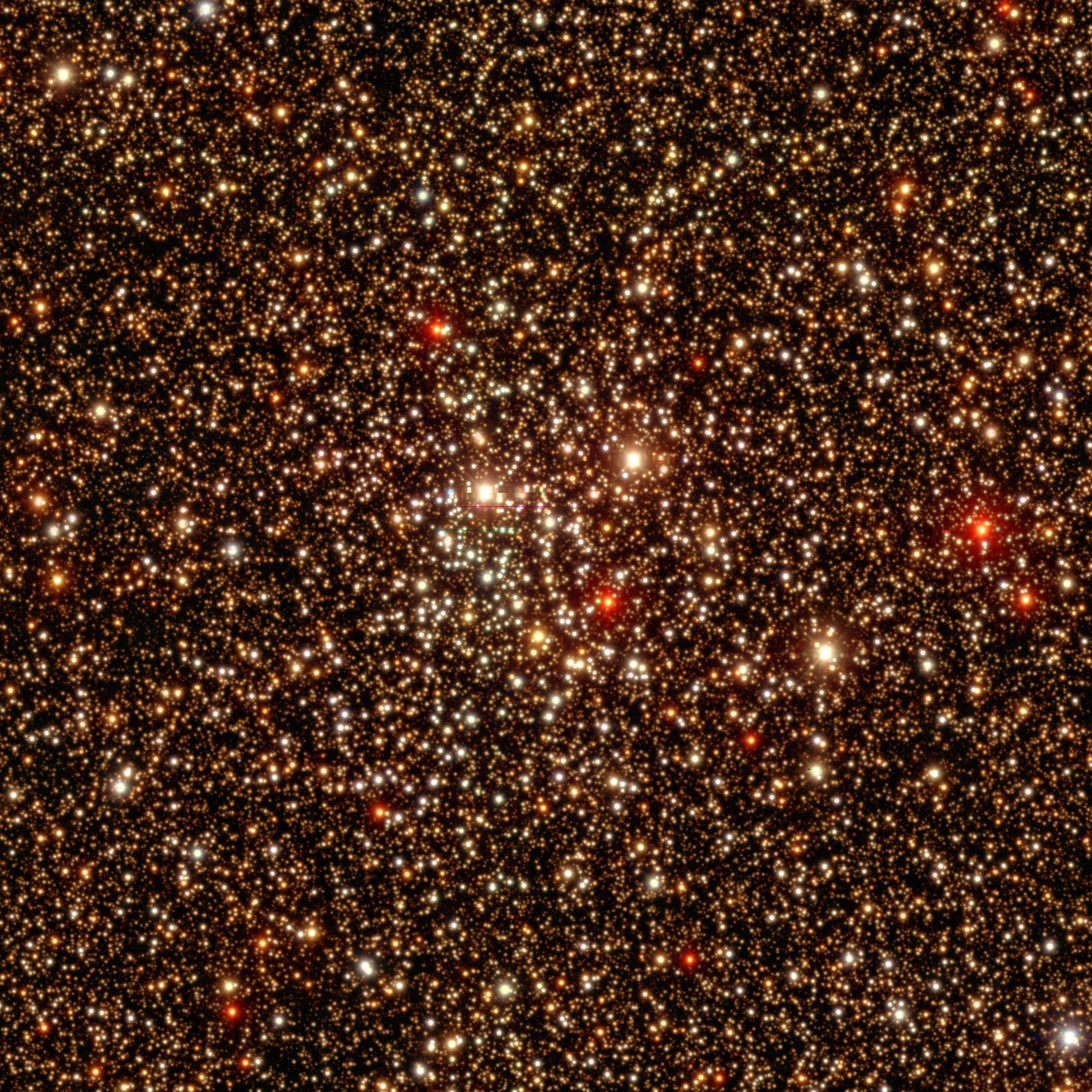
- NGC 4815 with legacy surveys

Observation data (J2000 epoch)
- Right ascension: 12^{h} 58^{m} 01^{s}
- Declination: −64° 57′ 36″
- Distance: 10,040 ly (3,079 pc)
- Apparent magnitude (V): 8.6
- Apparent dimensions (V): 7'

Physical characteristics
- Mass: 880 ±230 M_{☉}
- Estimated age: 400 million years
- Other designations: Cr 265, VDBH 142

Associations
- Constellation: Musca

NGC 4815 is an open cluster in the constellation Musca. It was discovered by John Herschel in 1834. It is located approximately 10,000 light years away from Earth.

== Characteristics ==
NGC 4815 is an intermediate age cluster. Carraro and Ortolani determined the age of the cluster to be 500 million years, based on BV photometry, which is nearly the same as the Hyades, while Sagar et al. determined its age at 400±50 million years and Kharchenko et al. at 400 million years. Friel at al. estimated its age to be between 500 and 630 million years.

There are 69 probable member stars within the angular radius of the cluster and 39 within the central part of the cluster. Five blue stragglers have been detected in the cluster, and 15 red giants are probable members of the cluster. The earliest main sequence stars are of type A0. One of the stars in the cluster region shows extremely red colour along with blue ultraviolet colour and it could be an interacting binary star. The turnoff point is at 2.6 ±0.1 M_{☉}.

The members show small dispersions in abundance, with the exception of Mg, which is common for clusters of rather low mass, as NGC 4815. The mean metallicity of the cluster is [Fe/H] = +0.03 ± 0.05 dex (as estimated by Frieal et al.) or −0.01 ± 0.04 (as estimated by Tautvaišienė et al.). Alpha-elements [Ca/Fe] and [Si/Fe] show solar ratios, [Mg/Fe] is moderately enhanced, [Ti/Fe] is slightly subsolar, [Al/Fe] is enhanced, and [Na/Fe] is significantly enhanced. THE CNO abundances in the cluster are [C/H] = −0.17 ± 0.08, [N/H] = 0.53 ± 0.07, [O/H] = 0.12 ± 0.09, and [C/N] = 0.79 ± 0.08.
