= NGC 4463 =

Open cluster in the constellation Musca

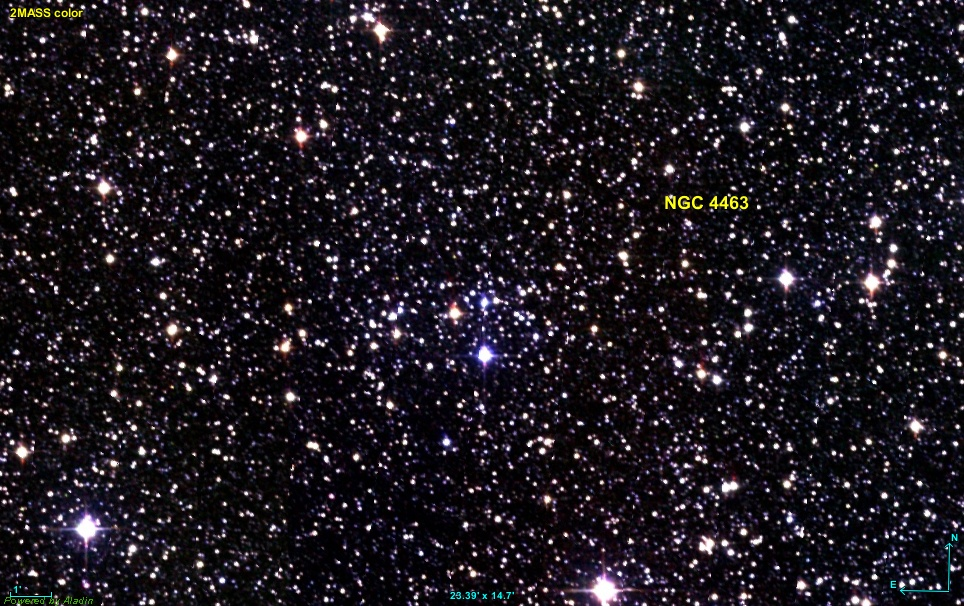

Observation data (J2000 epoch)
- Right ascension: 12^{h} 30^{m}
- Declination: −64° 47′

Physical characteristics
- Other designations: Cr 260

Associations
- Constellation: Musca

NGC 4463 is an open cluster in the constellation Musca. The young planetary nebula He 2-86 is believed to be a member of the cluster.
