= GR Muscae =

Star in the constellation Musca

Observation data Epoch J2000.0 Equinox ICRS
- Constellation: Musca
- Right ascension: 12^{h} 57^{m} 37.153^{s}
- Declination: −69° 17′ 18.98″
- Apparent magnitude (V): 19.1

Database references
SIMBAD	data

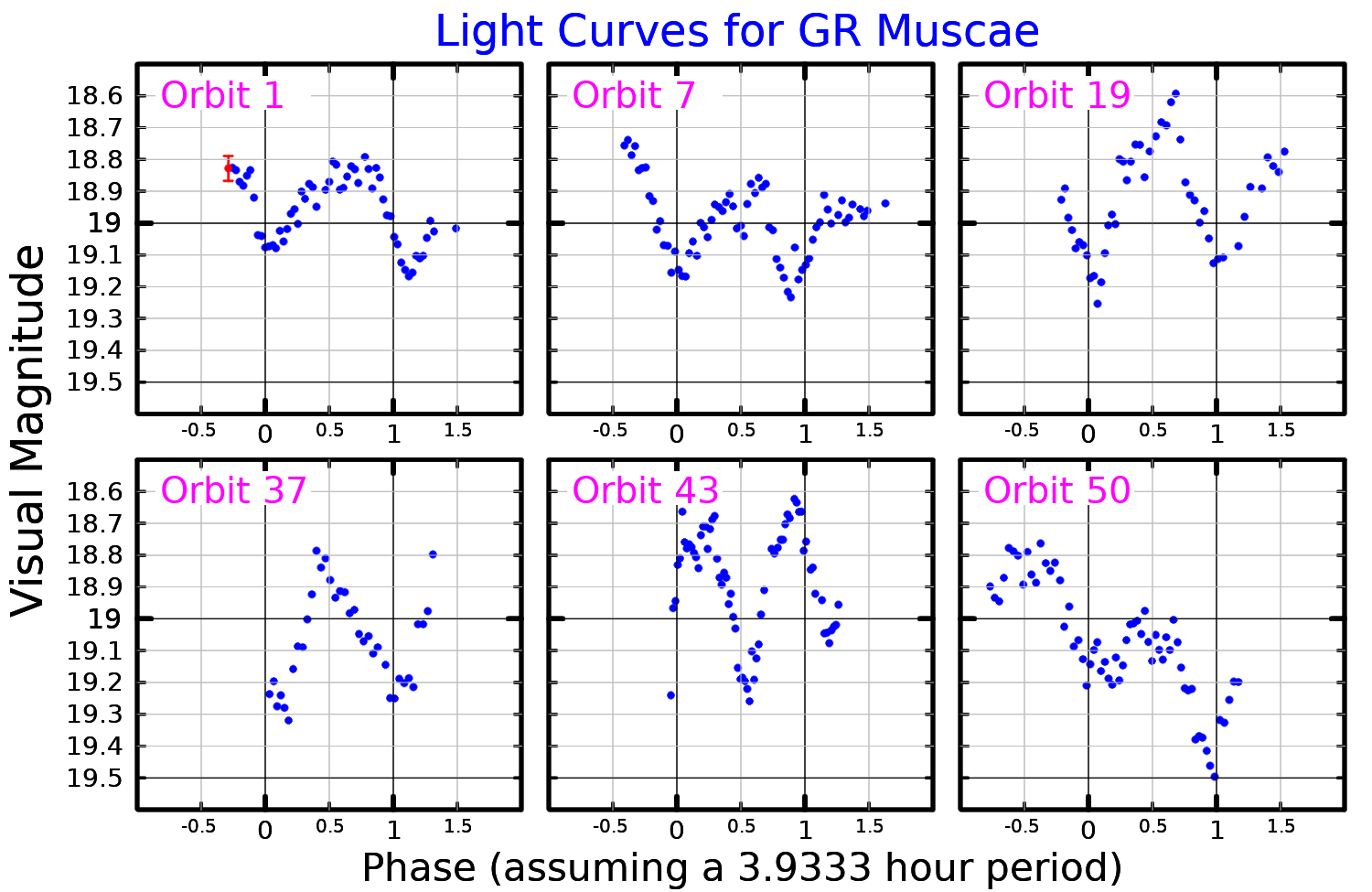
Visual band light curves for GR Muscae, adapted from Cornelisse et al. (2013).

GR Muscae, also known as 2S 1254-690, is a binary star system in the constellation Musca composed of a neutron star of between 1.2 and 1.8 times the mass of the Sun and a low-mass star likely to be around the mass of the Sun in close orbit. A magnitude 19 blue star was pinpointed as the optical counterpart of the X-ray source in 1978. Its apparent magnitude varies from 18 to 19.1 over a period of 0.16 days.

While the optical counterpart to the X-ray source was identified in 1978, optical variability was not detected until 1980, when a bright flare was seen that increased the white-light flux by a factor of two in a time interval of about 1.7 seconds. GR Muscae received its variable star designation in 1985.

The neutron star has an accretion disk that takes around 6.74 days to complete a revolution, and is inclined at an angle to the incoming stream of material from the donor star.
