= NGC 5694 =

Globular cluster in the constellation Hydra

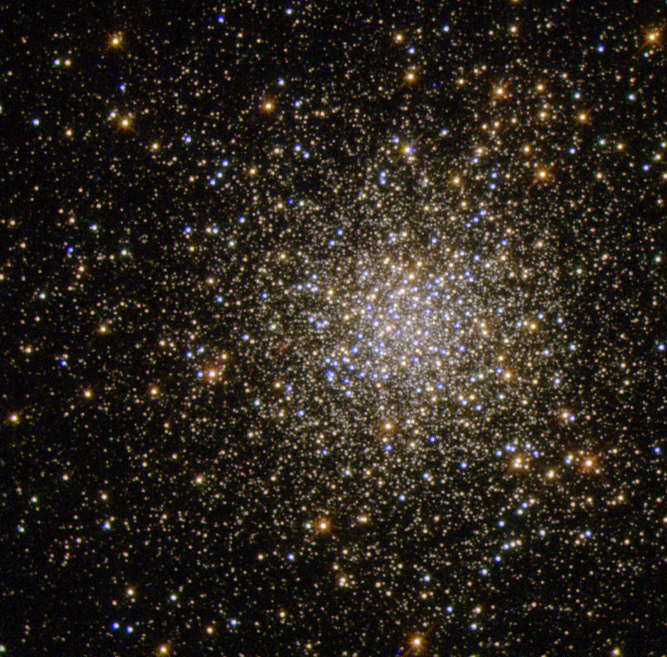
- The core of NGC 5694 imaged by the Hubble Space Telescope

Observation data (J2000 epoch)
- Class: VII
- Constellation: Hydra
- Right ascension: 14^{h} 39^{m} 36.5^{s}
- Declination: −26° 32′ 18.0″
- Distance: 114,100ly
- Apparent magnitude (V): 10.2
- Apparent dimensions (V): 3.6′

Physical characteristics
- Metallicity: [Fe/H] = –1.74 dex
- Estimated age: 13.44 Gyr
- Other designations: Caldwell 66

NGC 5694 (also known as Caldwell 66) is a globular cluster in the constellation Hydra. It was discovered by German-British astronomer William Herschel on 22 May 1784.

== Characteristics ==
This globular cluster is located at a distance of 114,000 light-years (35,000 pc) from the Sun and 96,000 light-years (29,000 pc) from the Galactic Center and is one of the oldest known globular clusters in the Milky Way Galaxy, forming nearly 12 billion years ago.

Its chemical composition is highly peculiar, being highly (to nearly solar levels) enriched in alpha elements, suggesting an extragalactic origin before being captured by the Milky Way.

== Noctua ==
NGC 5694 is located below the tail of the former constellation Noctua, which included faint stars within the modern IAU borders of Libra, Hydra, and Virgo.

== See also ==
- NGC 4372
