= Eta Muscae =

Variable star in the constellation Musca

- Location of η Muscae (circled in red)

Observation data Epoch J2000.0 Equinox J2000.0 (ICRS)
- Constellation: Musca
- Right ascension: 13^{h} 15^{m} 14.94123^{s}
- Declination: −67° 53′ 40.5276″
- Apparent magnitude (V): 4.79

Characteristics
- Spectral type: B8V + sim. + K9.4XR? + A0p or B7III + B7III
- B−V color index: −0.078±0.003
- Variable type: eclipsing binary

Astrometry
Radial velocity (R_{v})	−8.1±7.4 km/s
Proper motion (μ)	RA: +30.207 mas/yr Dec.: +17.921 mas/yr
Parallax (π)	7.1001±0.1924 mas
Distance	405.7 ly (124.4 pc)
Absolute magnitude (M_{V})	−0.81

Orbit
Period (P)	2.3963161 d
Semi-major axis (a)	14.11±0.15 R_{☉}
Eccentricity (e)	0.00
Inclination (i)	77.40°
Semi-amplitude (K_{1}) (primary)	145.35±0.20 km/s
Semi-amplitude (K_{2}) (secondary)	145.38±0.20 km/s

Details

Eta Mus Aa
Mass	3.30±0.04 M_{☉}
Radius	2.14±0.02 R_{☉}
Luminosity	223.77 (combined) L_{☉}
Surface gravity (log g)	4.293±0.005 cgs
Temperature	12,700±100 K
Rotational velocity (v sin i)	34±2 km/s

Eta Mus Ab
Mass	3.29±0.04 M_{☉}
Radius	2.13±0.04 R_{☉}
Surface gravity (log g)	4.298±0.005 cgs
Temperature	12,550±300 K
Rotational velocity (v sin i)	44±2 km/s

Other designations
- η Mus, CPD−67°2224, FK5 493, HD 114911, HIP 64661, HR 4993, SAO 252224, WDS J13152-6754A

Database references
SIMBAD	data

Eta Muscae is a multiple star system in the southern constellation of Musca. It is visible to the naked eye as a faint, blue-white hued point of light with an apparent visual magnitude of 4.79. The system is located around 406 light years away from the Sun. It is a member of the Lower Centaurs Crux subgroup of the Sco OB2 stellar association of co-moving stars.

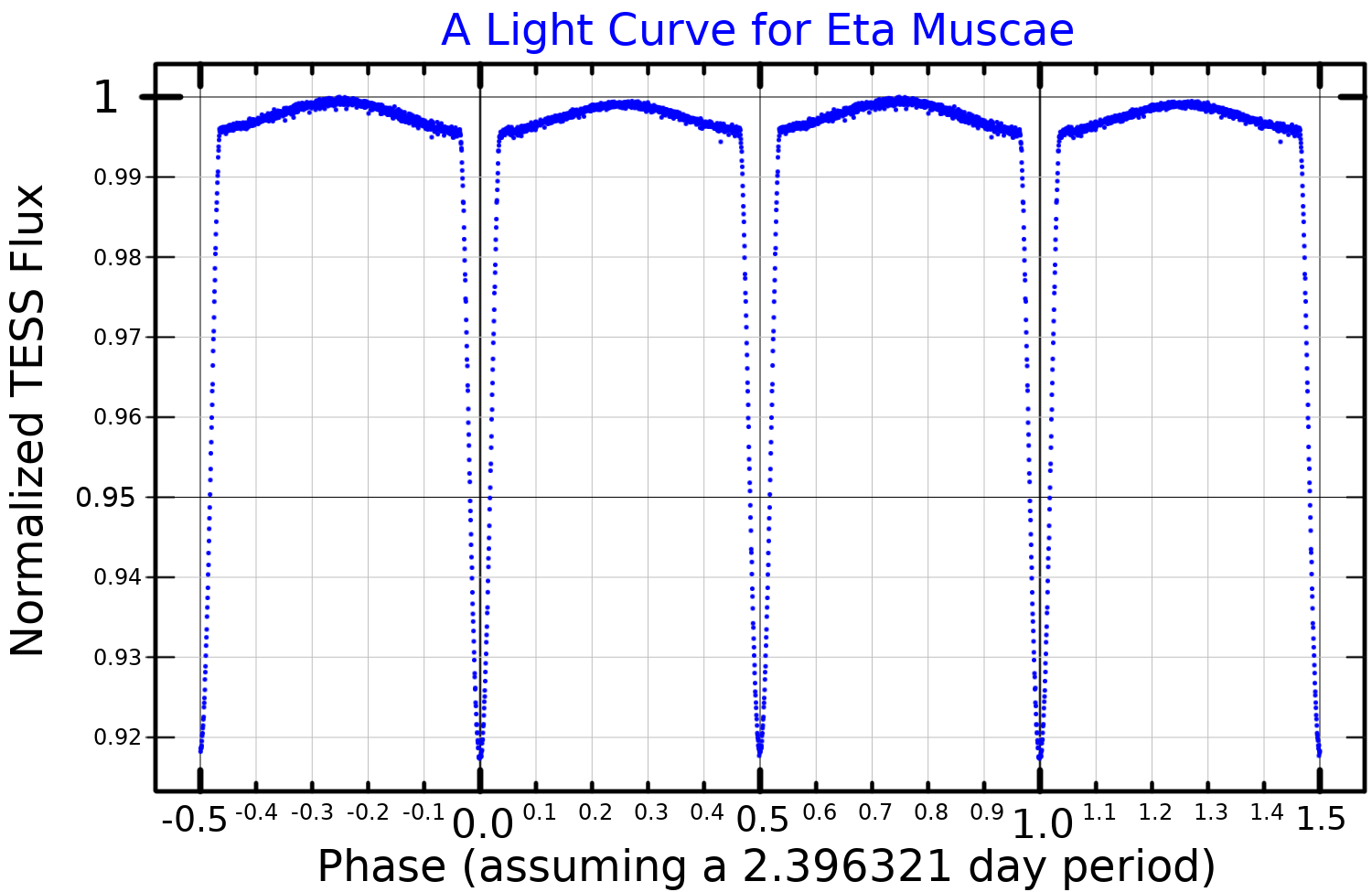
A light curve for Eta Muscae plotted from TESS data

The two main components of this system form a double-lined spectroscopic binary with a period of 2.4 days in a circular orbit. They are a detached eclipsing binary with a spectral type of B8V and a brightness that dips by 0.05 magnitude once per orbit. This pair consists of two components of similar mass and type.

Further away from the primary system are stars of magnitude 7.3 and 10, designated Eta Muscae B and C. It is unclear if these stars are gravitationally–bound to the main pair. Evidence for an additional component has been found with a 30-year cycle in the orbital behavior of the main pair. The data suggests an orbital eccentricity of 0.29 for this suspected component, Eta Muscae D.
