= HD 103079 =

Star in the constellation Musca

- Location of HD 103079 (circled)

Observation data Epoch J2000 Equinox ICRS
- Constellation: Musca
- Right ascension: 11^{h} 51^{m} 51.22424^{s}
- Declination: −65° 12′ 21.2764″
- Apparent magnitude (V): 4.89

Characteristics
- Evolutionary stage: main sequence
- Spectral type: B4V
- U−B color index: −0.53
- B−V color index: −0.11

Astrometry
Radial velocity (R_{v})	+20.60 km/s
Proper motion (μ)	RA: −34.879 mas/yr Dec.: −6.538 mas/yr
Parallax (π)	8.6793±0.1283 mas
Distance	376 ± 6 ly (115 ± 2 pc)
Absolute magnitude (M_{V})	−0.33

Details
Mass	5.0 M_{☉}
Luminosity	251 L_{☉}
Temperature	20,560 K
Metallicity [Fe/H]	0.00 dex
Rotational velocity (v sin i)	57 km/s

Other designations
- CPD−64°1724, CCDM J11519-6512AB, GC 16241, GSC 08981-04411, HIP 57851, HR 4549, HD 103079, SAO 251617, WDS J11519-6512AB

Database references
SIMBAD	data

HD 103079 is a class B4V (blue main-sequence) star in the constellation Musca. Its apparent magnitude is 4.89 and it is approximately 376 light years away from Earth based on parallax. It is a member of the Lower Centaurus–Crux subgroup of the Scorpius–Centaurus association, a group of predominantly hot blue-white stars that share a common origin and proper motion across the galaxy.

It has one reported companion with a magnitude of 7.41 and separation 1.549".
