= Gamma Muscae =

Star in the constellation Musca

γ Muscae
- Location of γ Muscae (circled)

Observation data Epoch J2000.0 Equinox ICRS
- Constellation: Musca
- Right ascension: 12^{h} 32^{m} 28.01343^{s}
- Declination: −72° 07′ 58.7597″
- Apparent magnitude (V): 3.87

Characteristics
- Evolutionary stage: main sequence
- Spectral type: B5 V
- U−B color index: −0.61
- B−V color index: −0.15
- Variable type: SPB

Astrometry
Radial velocity (R_{v})	2.5±7.4 km/s
Proper motion (μ)	RA: −51.34 mas/yr Dec.: −5.40 mas/yr
Parallax (π)	10.04±0.13 mas
Distance	325 ± 4 ly (100 ± 1 pc)
Absolute magnitude (M_{V})	−1.1

Details
Mass	5.09 M_{☉}
Radius	4.17 R_{☉}
Luminosity	790 L_{☉}
Surface gravity (log g)	3.87 cgs
Temperature	15,490 K
Rotational velocity (v sin i)	205 km/s
Age	67.7 Myr

Other designations
- γ Mus, CD−70°997, FK5 487, GC 17672, HD 109026, HIP 61199, HR 4773, SAO 257000

Database references
SIMBAD	data

γ Muscae, Latinised as Gamma Muscae, is a blue-white hued star in the southern circumpolar constellation of Musca, the Fly. It can be seen with the naked eye, having an apparent visual magnitude of 3.87. Based upon an annual parallax shift of 10.04 mas as seen from Earth, it is located about 325 light years from the Sun.

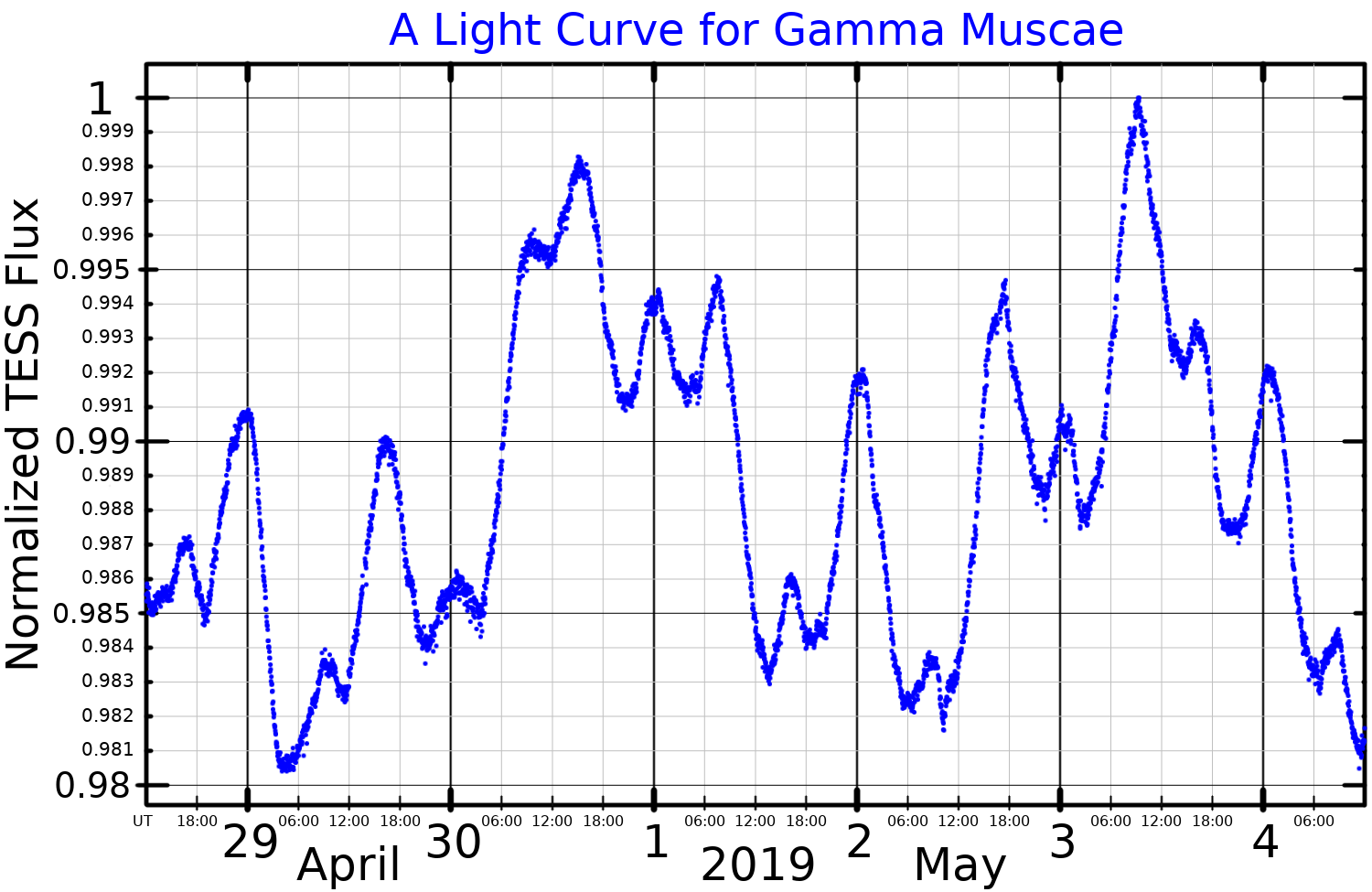
A light curve for Gamma Muscae, plotted from TESS data

This is a B-type main-sequence star with a stellar classification of B5 V. It is a variable star that ranges between magnitudes 3.84 and 3.86 over a period of 2.7 days, and is classed as a slowly pulsating B star. It is around five times as massive as the Sun. The star is spinning rapidly with a projected rotational velocity of 205 km/s. This is giving it an oblate shape with an equatorial bulge that is 7% larger than the polar radius.

Gamma Muscae is a proper motion member of the Lower Centaurus–Crux sub-group in the Scorpius–Centaurus OB association, the nearest such association of co-moving massive stars to the Sun.
