= Dark Doodad Nebula =

Nebula in the constellation Musca

Dark nebula
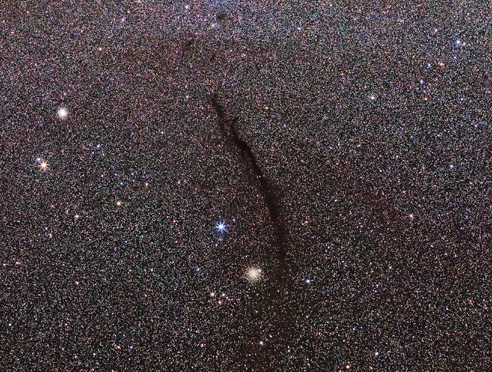
- The Dark Doodad is the vertical streak at center

Observation data: J2000 epoch
- Right ascension: 12^{h} 25^{m} 00^{s}
- Declination: −71° 42′ 00″
- Distance: 700 ly
- Constellation: Musca

Physical characteristics
- Dimensions: ≈3 degrees
- Designations: Sandqvist 149, CG 21, BHR 80, TGU H1875, DCld 301.7-07.2, [DB2002b] G301.70-7.16

The Dark Doodad Nebula is a dark nebula near the globular cluster NGC 4372, much closer than the centre of the galaxy and in the galactic plane, having a length of nearly three degrees of arc. Although officially unnamed, this long molecular cloud has come to be known under this name. It can be found in the southern constellation of Musca (the Fly) with strong binoculars.

This cloud consists of regions of dense gas and dust, and is one of the closest star forming regions to the Solar System. It was described in Sky & Telescope as one of the finest dark nebulae—one that is "wonderful, winding, and very definite". Just to the east of the southern end of the Dark Doodad is NGC 4372. It has also been called the Musca nebula and grouped as the Musca-Chamaeleonis Molecular Cloud.

== History ==
The nebula was catalogued by Aage Sandqvist, astronomer at Stockholm Observatory, in 1977. The name Dark Doodad was given to it by American amateur astronomer and writer Dennis di Cicco in 1986 upon seeing an image he took from Alice Springs in central Australia. Steven Coe gave it the name Sandqvist 149, because he believed it should be named after the astronomer who found it, though he acknowledges that the popular term prevails.

== Gallery ==
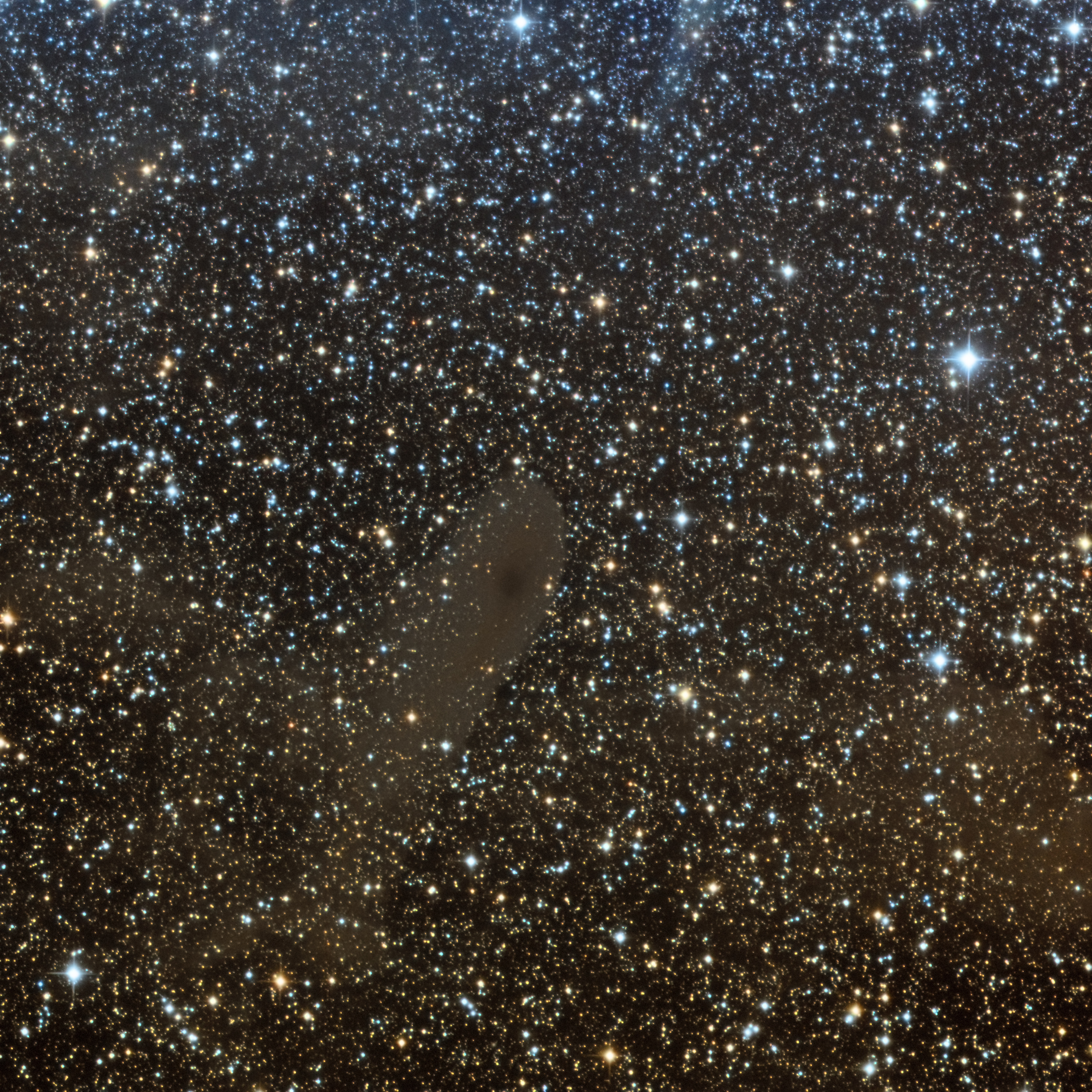
Dark Doodad Nebula in LRGB
