= NGC 4833 =

Globular cluster in the constellation Musca

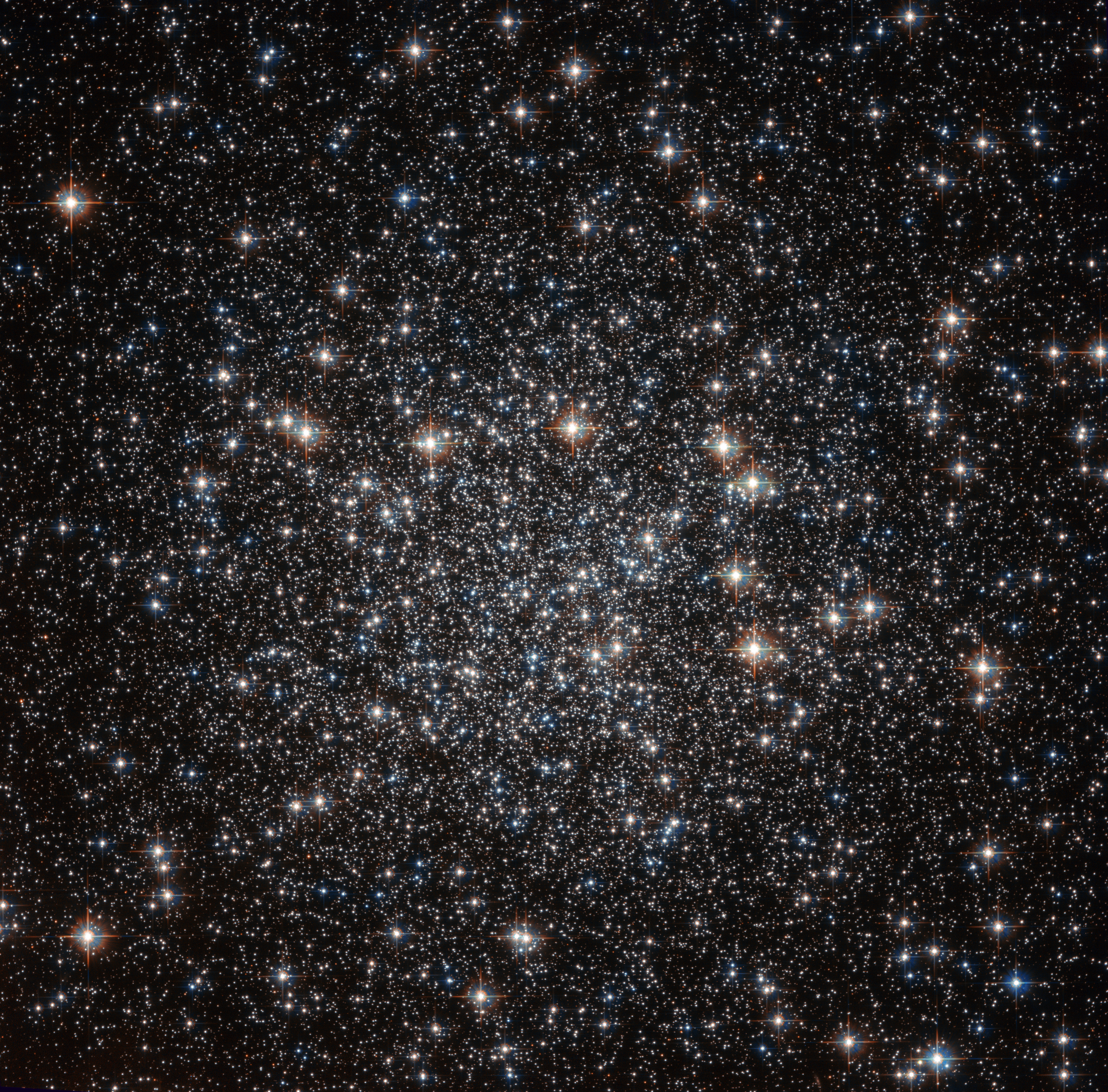
- NGC 4833 is one of the over 150 globular clusters known to reside within the Milky Way.

Observation data (J2000 epoch)
- Class: VIII
- Constellation: Musca
- Right ascension: 12^{h} 59^{m} 33.92^{s}
- Declination: –70° 52′ 35.4″
- Distance: 21.5 kly (6.6 kpc)
- Apparent magnitude (V): +7.79
- Apparent dimensions (V): 13.5′

Physical characteristics
- Absolute magnitude: −8.16
- Mass: 4.10×10^{5} M_{☉}
- Radius: 42 ly
- Metallicity: [Fe/H] = –2.02 dex
- Estimated age: 12.54 Gyr
- Other designations: NGC 4833, Caldwell 105, GCl 21, Lacaille I.4, Dunlop 164, Bennett 56

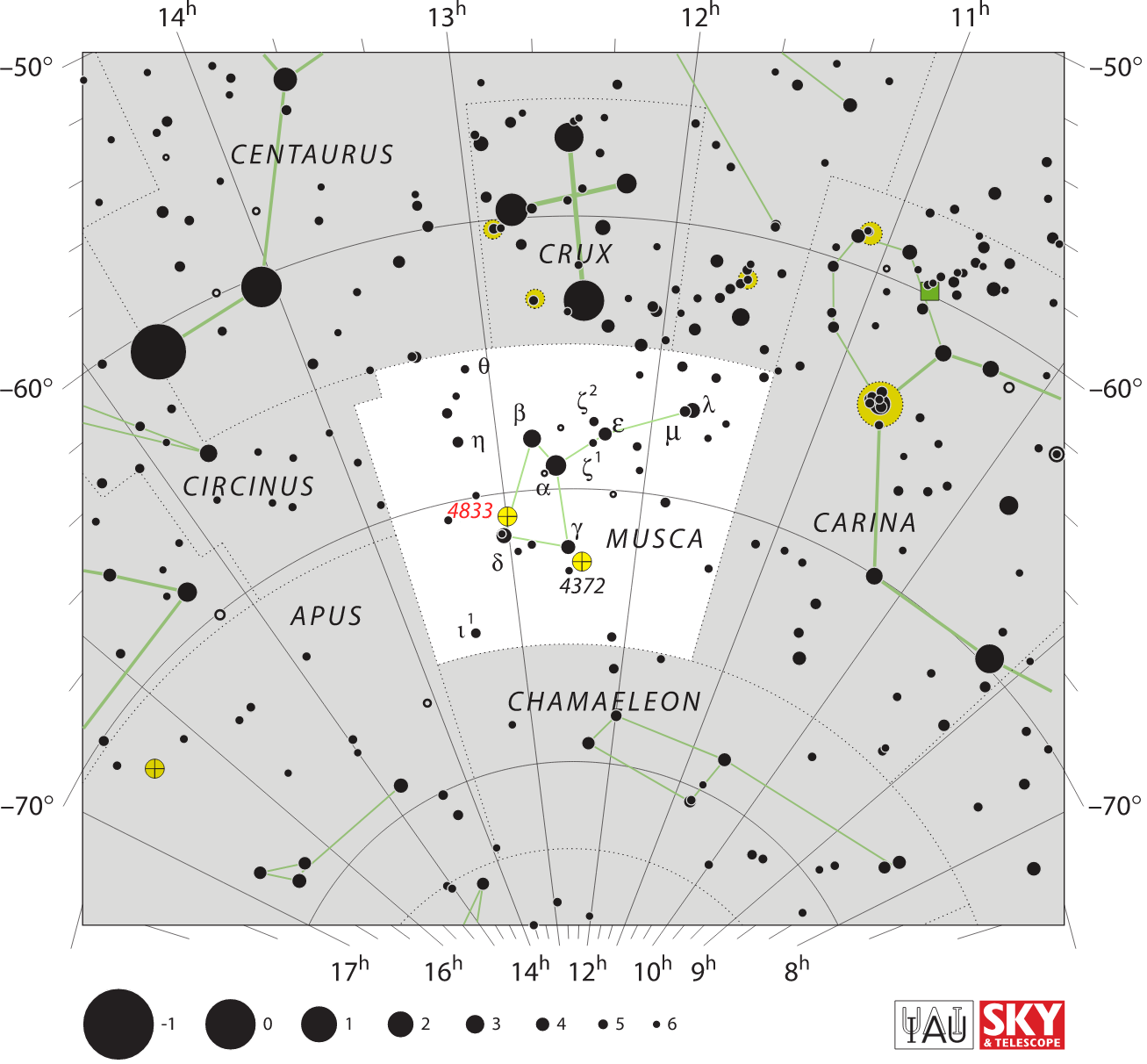
The location of NGC 4833 (labelled in red)

NGC 4833 is a globular cluster discovered by Abbe Lacaille during his 1751–1752 journey to South Africa, and catalogued in 1755. It was subsequently observed and catalogued by James Dunlop and Sir John Herschel whose instruments could resolve it into individual stars.

The globular cluster is situated in the very southerly constellation Musca at a distance of 21,500 light years from Earth. It is located near the Coalsack Nebula and is partially obscured by this dusty region of the galactic plane. After corrections for the reddening by dust, evidence was obtained that it is in the order of 2 billion years older than globular clusters M5 or M92.

This is a massive, metal-poor globular cluster that shows evidence for multiple generations of stars. It is an old halo cluster of the Oosterhoff type II. The orbit of the cluster through the galaxy is very eccentric, with an eccentricity of 0.84 that carries it close to the Galactic Center. The cluster has likely lost a significant portion of its original mass due to interactions with the galactic bulge.

A 2012 survey for variable stars identified six SX Phe, two eclipsing binaries (including a W UMa), and 19 RR Lyr variables.

== See also ==
- New General Catalogue
