= SY Muscae =

Star in the constellation Musca

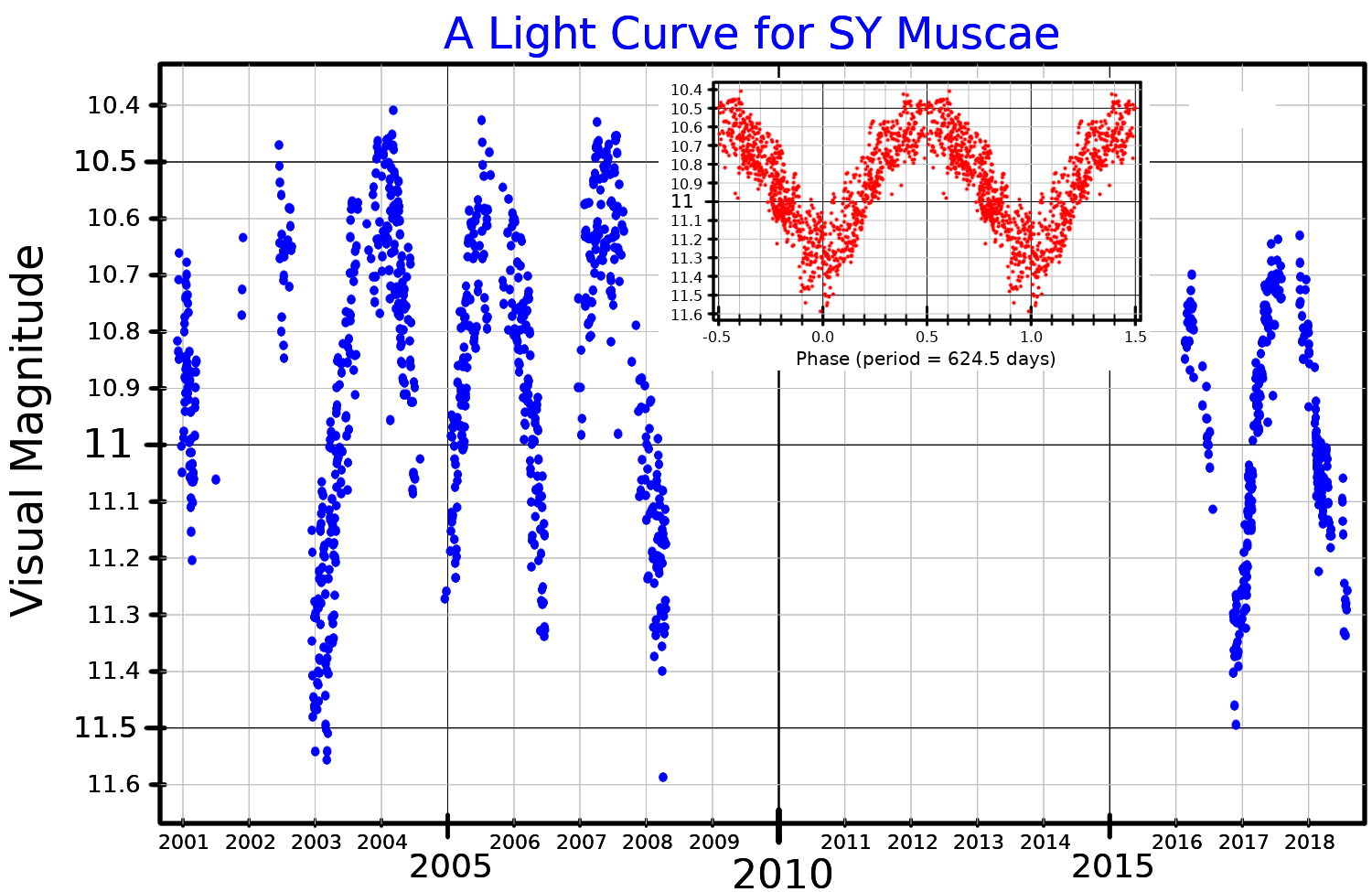
- A visual band light curve for SY Muscae, plotted from ASAS and ASAS-SN data. The inset plot shows the same data plotted with respect to the phase of the orbital period.

Observation data Epoch J2000 Equinox J2000
- Constellation: Musca
- Right ascension: 11^{h} 32^{m} 10.0002^{s}
- Declination: −65° 25′ 11.473″
- Apparent magnitude (V): 10.2 (- 11.2) - 12.7

Characteristics
- Evolutionary stage: AGB
- Spectral type: M4.5
- Variable type: Z And

Astrometry
Radial velocity (R_{v})	+13.708 km/s
Parallax (π)	0.08±0.90 mas
Distance	1,500 pc

Orbit
Period (P)	624.36 days
Eccentricity (e)	0.0
Inclination (i)	84°
Semi-amplitude (K_{1}) (primary)	7.76 km/s

Details

Giant
Mass	1.50±0.4 M_{☉}
Radius	138.6+6.6 −6.1 R_{☉}
Luminosity	2,305+224 −199 L_{☉}
Temperature	3,400 K
Rotation	>1,075 days
Rotational velocity (v sin i)	7 km/s

White dwarf
Mass	0.5±0.07 M_{☉}

Other designations
- SY Muscae, HD 100336, IRAS 11299-6508, 2MASS J11320998-6525114

Database references
SIMBAD	data

SY Muscae is a binary star system in the constellation Musca composed of a red giant and a white dwarf. Its apparent magnitude varies from 10.2 to 12.7 over a period of 624.5 days. Although the binary is a symbiotic star system, it is unusual in that it does not have an eruptive component. It is an S-type symbiotic system, which means that the light comes from the stars rather than surrounding dust.

In 1914, it was announced that Annie Jump Cannon had discovered that the star is a variable star, from the examination of nine photographs taken from 1896 through 1905. It was given its variable star designation, SY Muscae, in 1925.

With optical spectrometry, the red giant has been calculated as having a surface temperature of 3500 K and spectral type M4.5III, with around 1.3 times the Sun's mass, 86 times its radius and 1000 times its luminosity. The white dwarf is only 0.43 times the mass of the Sun. The two stars are 1.72 astronomical units (AU) apart, and take 624 days to orbit each other. The red giant also pulsates with a period of 56 days. The surface of the giant star extends to 40% of the distance to the Lagrange point L_{1}, and hence does not fill its Roche Lobe and cause the white dwarf to gain an accretion disc. The system was calculated at being around 850 parsecs (2771 light-years) distant.
