= HD 100546 =

Star in the constellation Musca

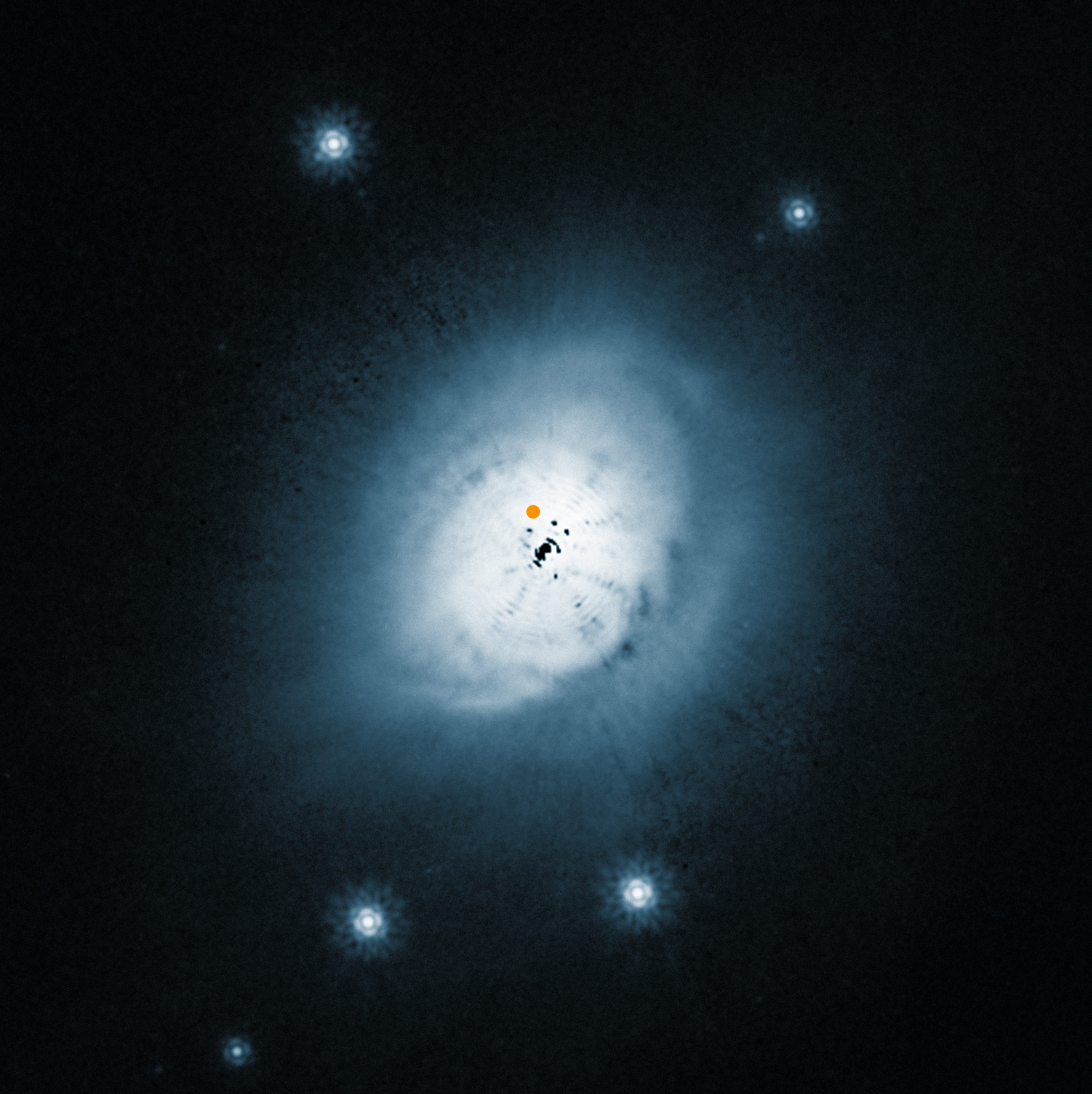
- This image from the NASA/ESA Hubble Space Telescope shows a visible light view of the outer dust around the young star HD 100546, with the newly discovered protoplanet positioned and marked by an orange spot. Artifacts from the brilliant central star dominate the inner part of this picture, which has been digitally subtracted. Black blobs are also artifacts.

Observation data Epoch J2000.0 Equinox ICRS
- Constellation: Musca
- Right ascension: 11^{h} 33^{m} 25.441^{s}
- Declination: −70° 11′ 41.24″
- Apparent magnitude (V): 6.67 to 6.92

Characteristics
- Evolutionary stage: Herbig Ae/Be star
- Spectral type: kB8 – A0Vae
- Apparent magnitude (B): 6.71±0.01
- Apparent magnitude (V): 6.30
- Apparent magnitude (G): 6.686±0.003
- Apparent magnitude (I): 6.64±0.05
- Apparent magnitude (J): 6.425±0.020
- Apparent magnitude (H): 5.96±0.03
- Apparent magnitude (K): 5.418±0.023
- Variable type: UX Ori

Astrometry
Radial velocity (R_{v})	9.10±1.2 km/s
Proper motion (μ)	RA: −38.730(46) mas/yr Dec.: −0.097(39) mas/yr
Parallax (π)	9.2494±0.0375 mas
Distance	353 ± 1 ly (108.1 ± 0.4 pc)

Details
Mass	2.10+0.05 −0.03 M_{☉}
Radius	1.83±0.05 R_{☉}
Luminosity	21.9±0.5 L_{☉}
Surface gravity (log g)	4.01±0.03 cgs
Temperature	9,750±500 K
Metallicity [Fe/H]	−1.0 – −1.4±0.2 dex
Rotation	1.52±0.10 days
Rotational velocity (v sin i)	58±3 km/s
Age	7.67+0.36 −0.67 Myr

Other designations
- KR Mus, CD−69°893, HIP 56379, SAO 251457

Database references
SIMBAD	data

HD 100546, also known as KR Muscae, is a pre-main sequence star of spectral type B8 to A0 located 353 light-years (108 parsecs) from Earth in the southern constellation of Musca. The star is surrounded by a circumstellar disk from a distance of 0.2 to 4 AU, and again from 13 AU out to a few hundred AU, with evidence for a protoplanet forming at a distance of around 47 AU.

Estimated to be less than 10 million years old, it belongs to Herbig Ae/Be stars, and also the nearest example to the Solar System.

== Planetary system ==
The HD 100546 planetary system
Companion (in order from star)	Mass	Semimajor axis (AU)	Orbital period (days)	Eccentricity	Inclination (°)	Radius
Inner disk	0.2–4 AU				33±11°	—
h (unconfirmed)	~25–50 M_{J}	5	—	0.8+0.1 −0.3	98+7 −58°	—
d (unconfirmed)	33–71 M_{J}	7.8	—	—	—	—
c (unconfirmed)	15 M_{J}	10	—	—	—	1.265 R_{J}
Outer disk	13–400 AU				44±8°	—
candidate 1 (unconfirmed)	8 M_{J}	13	—	—	—	—
e (unconfirmed)	—	20.5	—	—	—	—
b (disputed)	1.65–25 M_{J}	53±2	—	—	—	3.4 R_{J}
candidate 2 (unconfirmed)	3 M_{J}	143	—	—	—	—

The HD 100546 system as a whole has evidence for three protoplanets, thus it is considered an important evolutionary precursor to intermediate-mass stars with multiple super-jovian planets at moderate/wide separations like HR 8799. While other hypothetical planets have been claimed to exist around the star, none of the discoveries have been confirmed.

=== Planet b ===
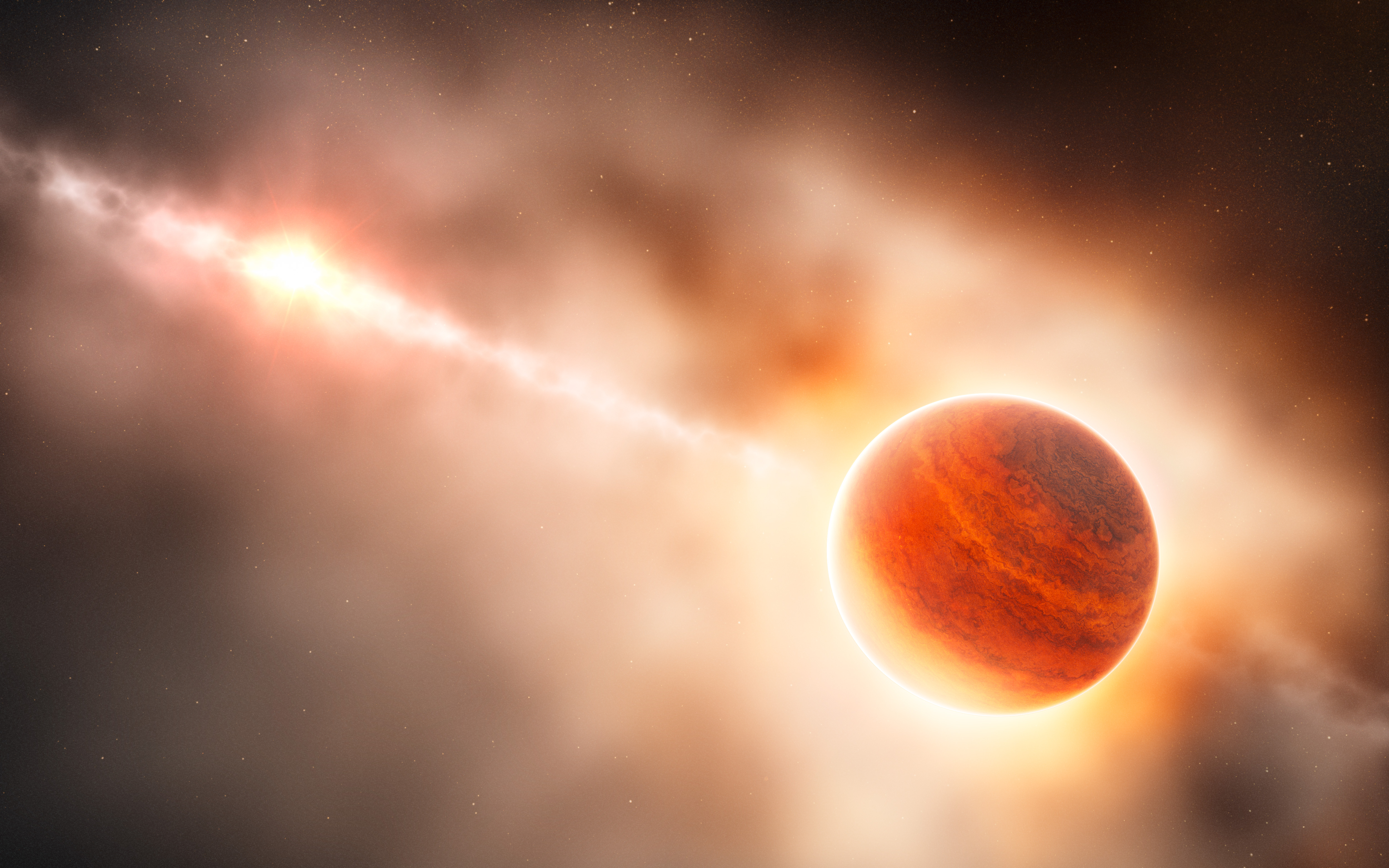
Artist's impression of the protoplanet HD 100546 b forming in its parent star's protoplanetary disc.

In 2013, researchers reported that they had found what seems to be a planet in the process of being formed, embedded in the star's large disc of gas and dust. If confirmed, it would represent the first opportunity to study the early stages of planet formation observationally. The flux from HD 100546 b and its circumplanetary disk (CPD) are superimposed, leaving its properties such as the radius and temperature very uncertain.

Various estimates for the mass of HD 100546 b have varied between 1 and 25 M_{J}. Although standard hot-start models imply a mass of approximately 15 M_{J}, other models and HD 100546 b's H-band photometry implies masses below 10 M_{J} for a 1-million-years-old newly born planet or if made visible by its CPD, while older ages suggest higher masses. More recently in 2019 an upper limit for the planetary mass was given to be as low as 1.65 M_{J} based on the relation between the planet, CPD, and circumstellar disk (CSD) masses derived from numerical simulation. The CPD has been assumed to be optically thin with derived upper mass and radius limits of 1.44 times as massive as Earth (M_{🜨}) and 0.44 astronomical unit (AU), while the mass of CSD was given to be 50 M_{J}. While gas-starved models are also still compatible, this would suggest that HD 100546 b is inconsistent with several planet accretion models.

Fitting a single temperature blackbody to the observed fluxes of the point source component gives a very large radius of 6.9+2.7
−2.9 times that of Jupiter (R_{Jup}) and an effective temperature of 932+193
−202 K for the emitting area surrounding the embedded protoplanet respectively. This large radius refers to the diffuse dust and gas envelope or debris disk surrounding the planet, not the planet itself; these estimates are mistakenly used as a single planetary radius and effective temperature for HD 100546 b by the NASA Exoplanet Archive. A best-fit luminosity was also found by the same study to be 2.3+0.6
−0.4×10^{−4} times as luminous as the Sun (L_{☉}).

Despite the uncertainty of the planet's properties, a 2017 study calculated HD 100546 b as a very highly reddened substellar object with a good-fit effective temperature of 2,630 K and a planetary mass and radius of 25 M_{Jup} and 3.4 R_{Jup}, making it still one of the largest exoplanets discovered by size.

=== Planet c ===
In April 2003, another planetary companion candidate was proposed and evidence was later gathered using the UVES echelle spectrograph at the VLT in Chile in 2005. This confirms other data indicating a planetary companion with a mass approximately 20 M_{J} and a distance of 6.5 AU from HD 100546, although further examination of the disk profile indicates it might be a more massive object such as a brown dwarf or more than one planet.

The same planetary companion, dubbed "HD 100546 c", was observed in 2014, and is calculated to have a mass estimated to be between 5 M_{J} and 20 M_{J}. With an estimated distance roughly 13 AU from HD 100546, circumstantial evidence suggests that HD 100546 c may be responsible for clearing out the inner disk cavity, although it would have been rapidly accreting gas, and thus it would be unusually bright. It was also expected to be surrounded by a circumplanetary disk of about 0.1 AU in radius. The planet is calculated to have an accretion rate up to 10^{−8} M_{☉} per year assuming a planetary mass of 15 M_{Jup}, which would correspond to a planetary radius of 0.13 R_{☉} based on evolutionary tracks. Thus, HD 100546 c is either in a relatively quiescent stage or its growth from accretion is at a low level or has already ceased. The presence of disturbance, possibly created by HD 100546 c, is also confirmed by the detection of sulphur monoxide, indicating a shockwaves propagating through the gas disk.

The position where HD 100546 c was detected was inside compared with the gap between the inner and outer disks, and outside compared with the central cavity, so the validity of the planet was shown from the characteristics of the star disk. There was a discrepancy with the discussion. This companion candidate has been contested, however, and it may be a weakly polarized disk feature instead.

=== Planet d ===
ALMA observations at 1.3 mm have revealed a point source at a position angle of 37° and a projected separation of 7.8 AU, it has a mass of 33 to 77 Jupiter masses which would make it a brown dwarf, which could represent an additional planetary candidate, hereafter HD 100546 d.

=== Planet h ===
The astronomers reanalyzed two epochs of archival VLT/SPHERE-IRDIS SAM data of HD 100546 observed in 2018 and 2021 and found that the tentatively detected point source moved by ~10 mas in separation and ~18° in position angle, over the three years of observations, placing the estimated mass of ~25 – 50 M_{J}. This is consistent with either HD 100546 h orbiting with a high eccentricity of ≿ 0.65, orbiting close to the disk plane, or this object with any eccentricity, orbiting at a large inclination relative to the disk of ~60°. Because of the location of the point source where the observed signal could possibly be reproduced by a bright asymmetry associated with the inner disk, follow-up high-contrast observations is necessary to fully understand the observed signal and distinguish between a low-mass (sub)stellar companion and a complex disk feature by either reobserving HD 100546 with VLT/SPHERE SAM to confirm orbital motion, or observing HD 100546 with VLTI/GRAVITY to constrain the size and morphology of the inner disk as a function of time.

=== Hypothetical planets ===
A disturbance in disk may have been caused by a ~10 M_{🜨} planet completely embedded in the dust shroud.

=== Circumstellar disk ===
Coronagraphic optical observations with the Hubble Space Telescope show complex spiral patterns in the circumstellar disk. The causes of these structures remain uncertain, although spirals are consistent with the instabilities caused by forming planets. The disk colors are similar to those derived for Kuiper Belt objects, suggesting that the same weathering processes are at work in HD 100546. The disk is fairly flat, consistent with an advanced evolutionary state, and have a wide gap at 40–150 AU radii, possibly carved by an outer planet in the gap.

Spectroscopic analysis of mid-IR data taken from OSCIR on the 4 m Blanco Telescope at Cerro Tololo Inter-American Observatory indicates the presence of a small particles (10–18 μm) containing silicates. The material is found at distances out to 17 AU away from the star and has a temperature of approximately 227 K.

== See also ==
- List of exoplanet extremes
