= GQ Muscae =

Nova in the constellation Musca

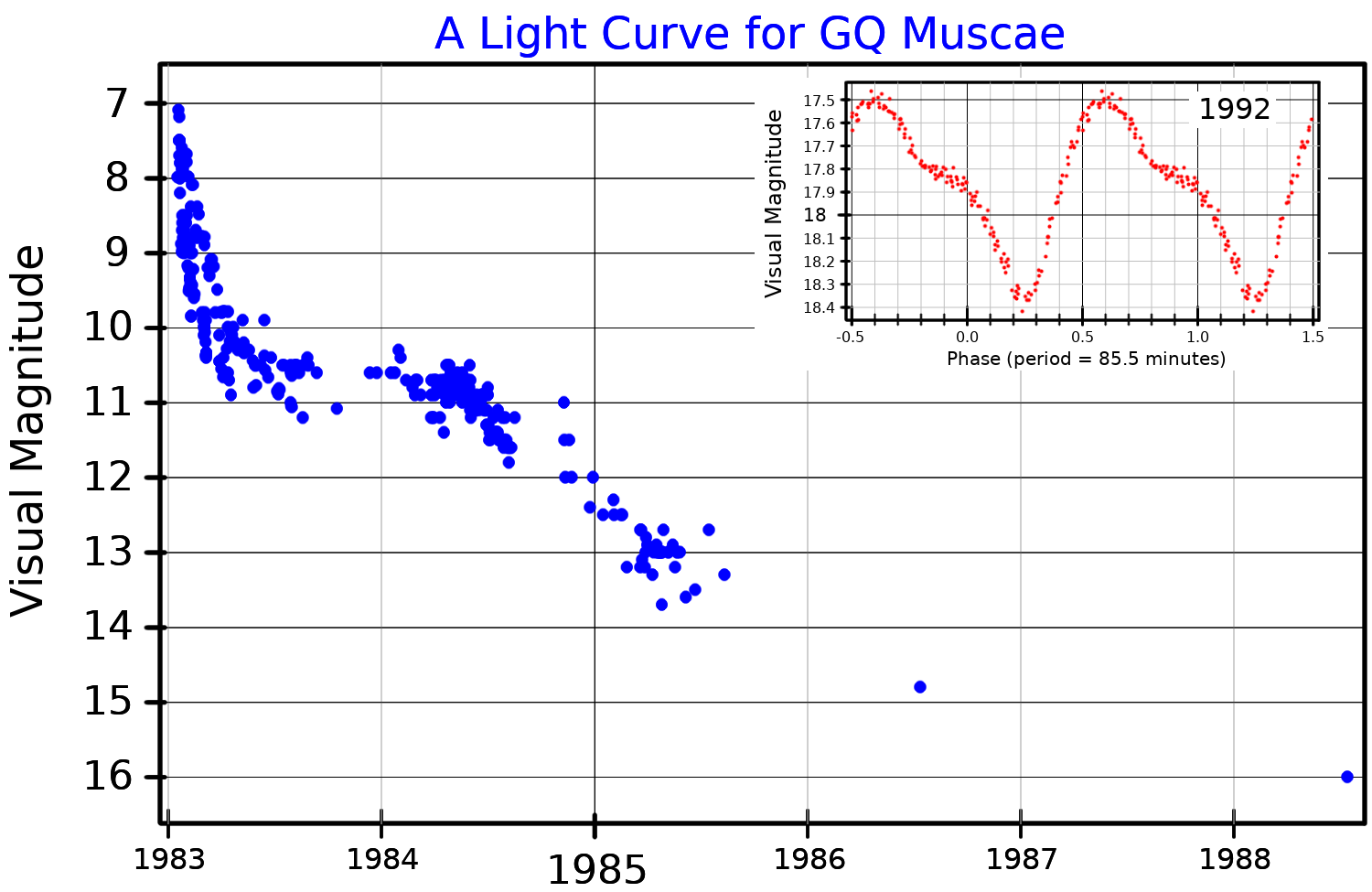
- A visual band light curve for GQ Muscae. The main plot shows the decline from the 1983 eruption, plotted with data from the AAVSO, Whitelock et al. and Liller. The inset plot (adapted from Narloch et al.) shows the post-eruption variability seen in 1992.

Observation data Epoch J2000 Equinox ICRS
- Constellation: Musca
- Right ascension: 11^{h} 52^{m} 02.4285^{s}
- Declination: −67° 12′ 20.991″
- Apparent magnitude (V): 7.2 Max. 21 Min.

Characteristics
- Variable type: Nova

Astrometry
Proper motion (μ)	RA: −5.056±0.451 mas/yr Dec.: 1.193±0.324 mas/yr
Parallax (π)	0.4702±0.2193 mas
Distance	2480+3780 −300 pc

Other designations
- AAVSO 1147-66, Nova Mus 1983, Gaia DR2 5236081560713688448

Database references
SIMBAD	data

GQ Muscae, also known as Nova Muscae 1983, is a nova in the constellation Musca, which was discovered by William Liller at 03:20 UT on 18 January 1983. At the time of its discovery it was a magnitude ≈7.2 object, and it subsequently faded.

GQ Muscae is a binary star system composed of a white dwarf and small star, the donor star, that is about 10% as massive as the Sun. The two orbit each other every 1.4 hours. The white dwarf accumulates material from the donor star until a runaway nuclear thermonuclear reaction erupts, as it did in 1983. GQ Muscae was the first nova from which X-rays were detected.
