= NGC 4372 =

Globular cluster in the constellation Musca

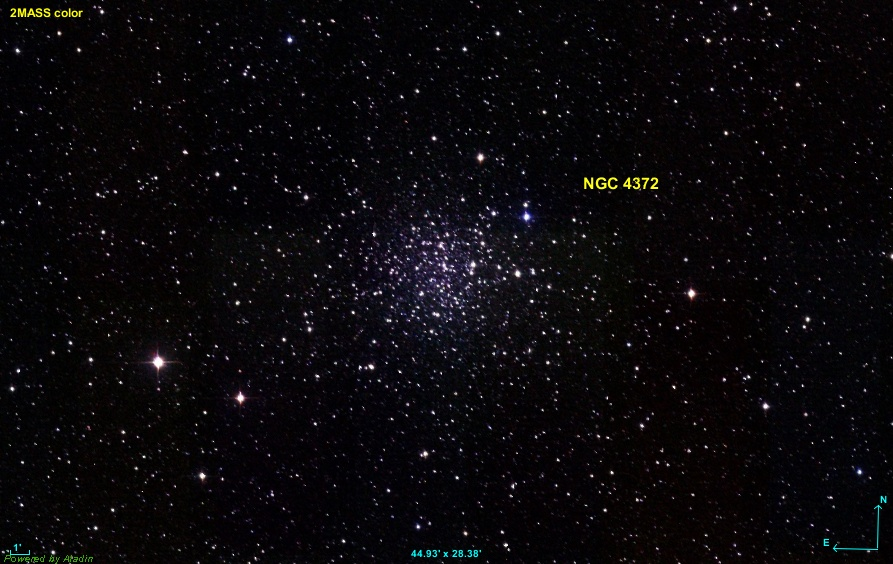
- NGC 4372 imaged by 2MASS

Observation data (J2000 epoch)
- Class: XII
- Constellation: Musca
- Right ascension: 12^{h} 25^{m} 45.43^{s}
- Declination: −72° 39′ 32.7″
- Distance: 18.9 kly (5.8 kpc)
- Apparent magnitude (V): 9.85
- Apparent dimensions (V): 18'

Physical characteristics
- Absolute magnitude: −8.52
- Mass: 3.29×10^{5} M_{☉}
- Radius: 49.5 ly
- Metallicity: [Fe/H] = –2.33±0.08 dex
- Estimated age: 12.54 Gyr
- Other designations: Caldwell 108

NGC 4372 (also known as Caldwell 108) is a globular cluster in the southern constellation of Musca. It is southwest of γ Muscae (Gamma Muscae) and west of the southern end of the Dark Doodad Nebula (Sandqvist 149), a 3° thin streak of black across a southern section of the great plane of the Milky Way.

NGC 4372 "is partially obscured by dust lanes, but still appears as a large object some 10 arcseconds in diameter," according to Astronomy of the Milky Way (2004).

The cluster has highly peculiar chemistry similar to NGC 5694, being extremely iron-poor yet having super-solar abundances of magnesium and titanium.
