= HD 112410 =

Star in the constellation Musca

Observation data Epoch J2000 Equinox ICRS
- Constellation: Musca
- Right ascension: 12^{h} 57^{m} 31.95991^{s}
- Declination: −65° 38′ 47.2594″
- Apparent magnitude (V): 6.86

Characteristics
- Evolutionary stage: red giant branch
- Spectral type: G8III
- B−V color index: 1.018±0.008

Astrometry
Radial velocity (R_{v})	72.82±0.15 km/s
Proper motion (μ)	RA: −65.486±0.043 mas/yr Dec.: +31.269±0.038 mas/yr
Parallax (π)	6.3628±0.0284 mas
Distance	513 ± 2 ly (157.2 ± 0.7 pc)
Absolute magnitude (M_{V})	1.22

Details
Mass	1.21±0.25; 1.54±0.05; 2.32±0.23 M_{☉}
Radius	9.56±0.15 R_{☉}
Luminosity	46.0±0.8 L_{☉}
Surface gravity (log g)	2.56±0.10 cgs
Temperature	4,860±32 K
Metallicity [Fe/H]	−0.28±0.05 dex
Rotational velocity (v sin i)	3.29±0.47 km/s
Age	4.17±2.34 Myr

Other designations
- CD−64°676, GC 17573, HD 112410, HIP 63242, SAO 252106, 2MASS J12573196-6538472

Database references
SIMBAD	data

HD 112410 is a star in the southern constellation of Musca. It has a yellow hue and is too dim to be readily visible to the average sight, having an apparent visual magnitude of 6.86. The distance to this star is 513 light years based on parallax, and it is drifting further away from the Sun with a radial velocity of 73 km/s. It has an absolute magnitude of 1.22.

This is an aging giant star with a stellar classification of G8III. It is cooling and expanding along the red giant branch, having evolved off the main sequence after exhausting its core supply of hydrogen fuel. At present it has 10 times the Sun's radius. Mass estimates range from 1.21 up to 2.32 times the mass of the Sun. The star has a lower metallicity the Sun – what astronomers term the abundance of elements with more mass than helium – and it is spinning with a projected rotational velocity of 3.3 km/s. It is radiating 46 times the luminosity of the Sun from its enlarged photosphere at an effective temperature of 4,860 K.

== Planetary system ==
HD 112410 has a substellar companion calculated to have a mass at least 9.2 times that of Jupiter and an orbital period of 124.6 days at a typical separation of approximately 0.57 astronomical units (AU). As of 2013, this is the nearest exoplanet orbiting around any ascending red giant branch star, and second-closest planet to a giant star after the companion of HIP 13044.

The HD 112410 planetary system
Companion (in order from star)	Mass	Semimajor axis (AU)	Orbital period (days)	Eccentricity	Inclination (°)	Radius
HD 112410 b	>9.18 M_{J}	0.565	124.6	0.23	—	—
