= Mu Muscae =

Star in the constellation Musca

- Location of μ Muscae (circled in red)

Observation data Epoch J2000.0 Equinox J2000.0 (ICRS)
- Constellation: Musca
- Right ascension: 11^{h} 48^{m} 14.53282^{s}
- Declination: −66° 48′ 53.6712″
- Apparent magnitude (V): 4.6 - 4.8

Characteristics
- Spectral type: K4 III
- U−B color index: +1.89
- B−V color index: +1.54
- Variable type: Lb

Astrometry
Radial velocity (R_{v})	+37.4±2.8 km/s
Proper motion (μ)	RA: −31.223 mas/yr Dec.: −15.938 mas/yr
Parallax (π)	7.2113±0.1762 mas
Distance	450 ± 10 ly (139 ± 3 pc)
Absolute magnitude (M_{V})	−0.85

Details
Radius	52.92+1.01 −0.95 R_{☉}
Luminosity	602.0±16.9 L_{☉}
Temperature	3,930+36 −37 K

Other designations
- μ Mus, CD−66°1114, HD 102584, HIP 57581, HR 4530, SAO 251597

Database references
SIMBAD	data

Mu Muscae, Latinized from μ Muscae, is a solitary star in the southern constellation of Musca. It is visible to the naked eye as a faint, orange-hued star with an apparent visual magnitude of around 4.75. Based upon an annual parallax shift of 7.21 mas as seen from Earth, it is located about 450 light years from the Sun. The star is drifting further away with a radial velocity of +37 km/s.

This is an evolved K-type giant star with a stellar classification of K4 III, having exhausted the supply of hydrogen at its core then cooled and expanded to 53 times the Sun's radius. It most likely on the red giant branch, rather than the asymptotic giant branch, and shows no signs of mass loss. Mu Muscae is a type Lb, oxygen-rich irregular variable with a small amplitude that ranges in visual magnitude between 4.71 and 4.76. It is radiating 602 times the luminosity of the Sun from its photosphere at an effective temperature of 3,930 K.
