= Epsilon Muscae =

Variable star in the constellation Musca

- Location of ε Muscae (circled in red)

Observation data Epoch J2000.0 Equinox J2000.0 (ICRS)
- Constellation: Musca
- Right ascension: 12^{h} 17^{m} 34.27564^{s}
- Declination: −67° 57′ 38.6525″
- Apparent magnitude (V): 4.0 – 4.3

Characteristics
- Evolutionary stage: asymptotic giant branch
- Spectral type: M5 III
- Variable type: SRb

Astrometry
Radial velocity (R_{v})	7.1±0.7 km/s
Proper motion (μ)	RA: −230.607±0.187 mas/yr Dec.: −26.206±0.263 mas/yr
Parallax (π)	9.9915±0.2 mas
Distance	326 ± 7 ly (100 ± 2 pc)
Absolute magnitude (M_{V})	−0.77

Details
Mass	2±0.3 M_{☉}
Radius	116±9 R_{☉}
Luminosity	1,738 L_{☉}
Surface gravity (log g)	0.6±0.02 cgs
Temperature	3,470±125 K

Other designations
- ε Mus, CD−67 1216, CPD−67 1931, HD 106849, HIP 59929, HR 4671, SAO 251830

Database references
SIMBAD	data

Epsilon Muscae, Latinized from ε Muscae, is a red giant star of spectral type M5III in the constellation Musca. It is a 4th magnitude star, visible to the naked eye under good observing conditions. It is about 330 light-years from the Earth.

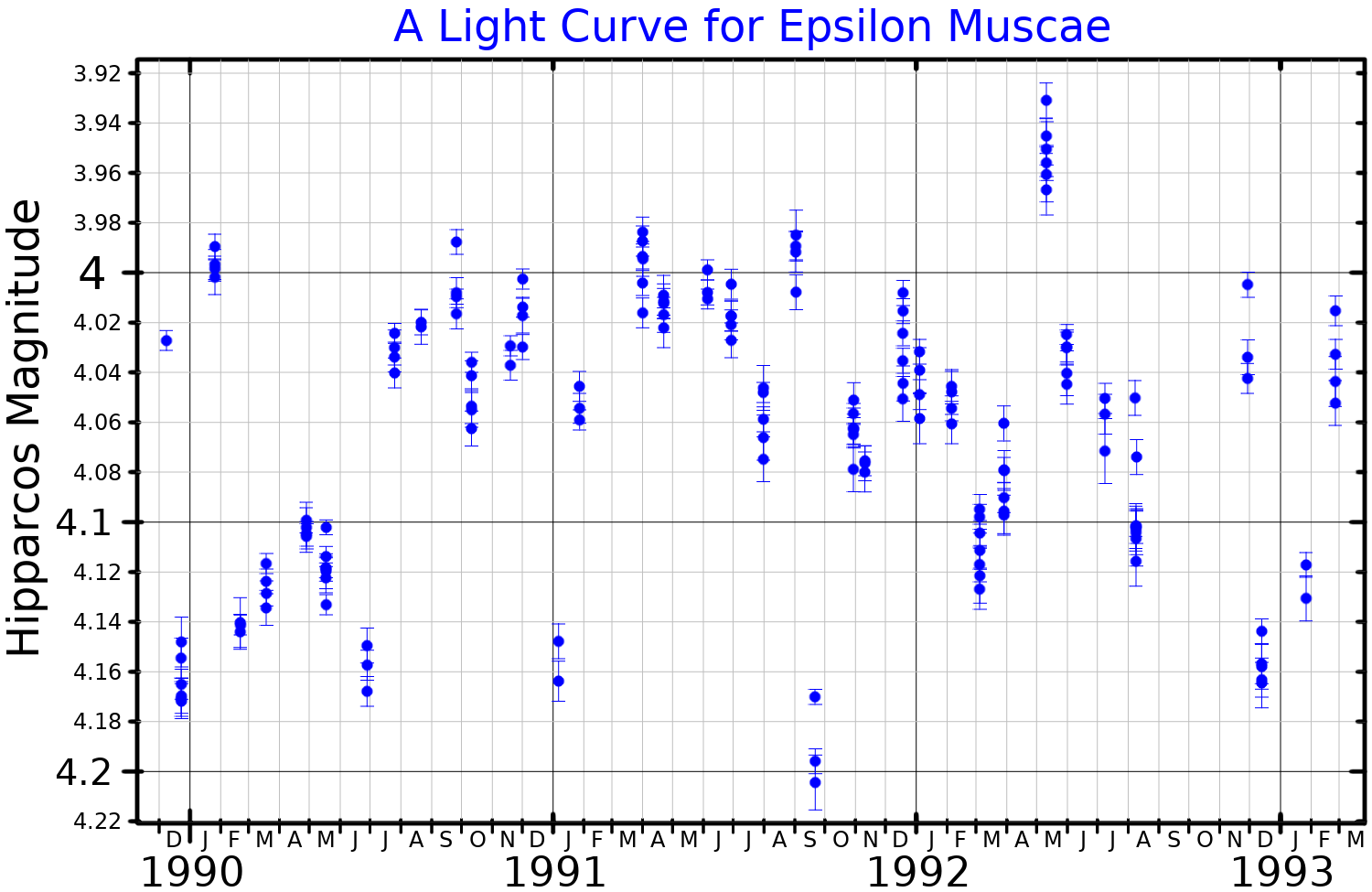
A light curve for Epsilon Muscae, plotted from Hipparcos data

Originally a main-sequence star of around 2 solar masses, Epsilon Muscae is now on the asymptotic giant branch and has expanded to 117 times the Sun's diameter and 1,700 its luminosity. It is a semiregular variable, varying between visual magnitudes 4.0 and 4.3 in eight distinct periods ranging from a month to over half a year in length. Its distance from the Earth is about the same as the Lower Centaurus–Crux subgroup of the Scorpius–Centaurus association, although it is moving much faster at around 100 km/s and does not share a common origin.
