= BHR 71 =

Nebula in the constellation Musca

Dark nebula
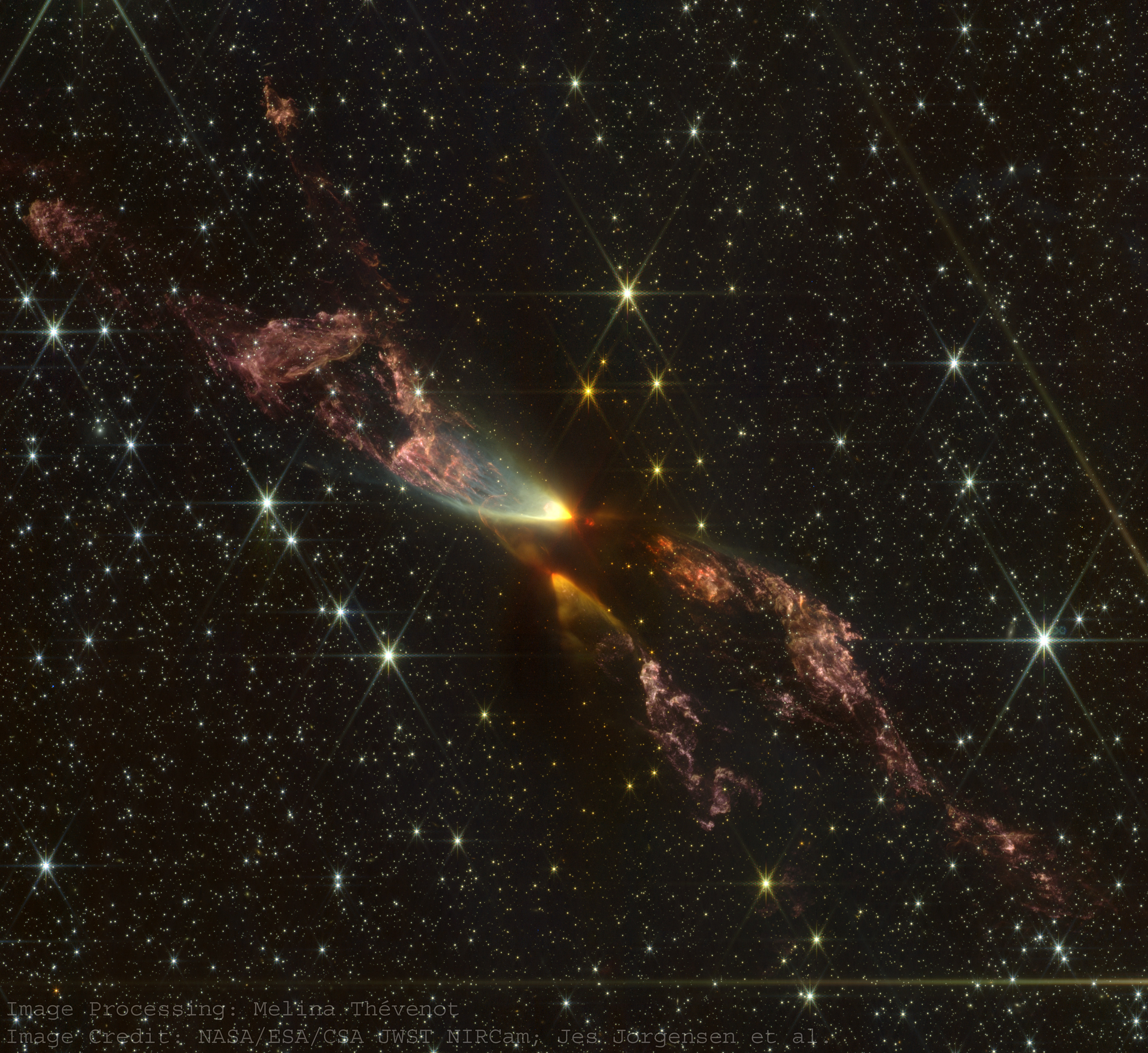
- BHR 71 with James Webb Space Telescope NIRCam

Observation data: epoch
- Right ascension: 12^{h} 01^{m} 37.0^{s}
- Declination: −65° 08′ 48″
- Distance: 600 ly
- Constellation: Musca

Physical characteristics
- Radius: 1 ly
- Designations: BHR 71, Sandqvist 136

BHR 71 (also known as Sandqvist 136) is a small dark nebula and a bok globule in the constellation of Musca which is 600 light years from the Solar System. It has a diameter of about 1 light year. The globule has a mass of 40 M_{☉} and a kinetic temperature of 11 Kelvin.

== Discovery ==
BHR 71 is also called Sandqvist 136 and was discovered in 1977 by A. Sandqvist with the ESO B Atlas. In 1995 it was included in a catalogue by T. L. Bourke, A. R. Hyland and G. Robinson, which lists small molecular clouds, called globule. The listed objects were later given the acronym BHR, using the first letters of the surnames of the authors.

== Binary Protostar ==
In 1997 a study discovered a highly collimated bipolar outflow in the center of the bok globule. This originates from a class 0 protostar called IRAS 11590-6452.

In 2001 new observations in the near-infrared with the Anglo-Australian Telescope and carbon monoxide (CO) observations with the Swedish-ESO Submillimetre Telescope found that the source was in fact two individual protostars called IRS 1 and IRS 2. The protostars have a separation of about 17 arcseconds (or 3400 AU). Each protostar is driving its own molecular outflow, with IRS 1 driving the larger outflow and being more massive. The objects were observed with the Australian Telescope Compact Array and the Spitzer Space Telescope. This study found that the binary is the result of a rotational fragmentation of a single collapsing protostellar core. A later study using ALMA did, however, find that the binary formed via turbulent fragmentation of the core.

Dust observations with ALMA did find compact objects with no clear keplerian motion, meaning potential disks are not detected. The disks are likely deeply embedded in an envelope and therefore not detected. The researchers were able to set upper limits of the mass of the protostars. IRS 1 has an upper limit of 0.46 M_{☉} and IRS 2 has an upper limit of 0.26 M_{☉}.

=== The outflows ===
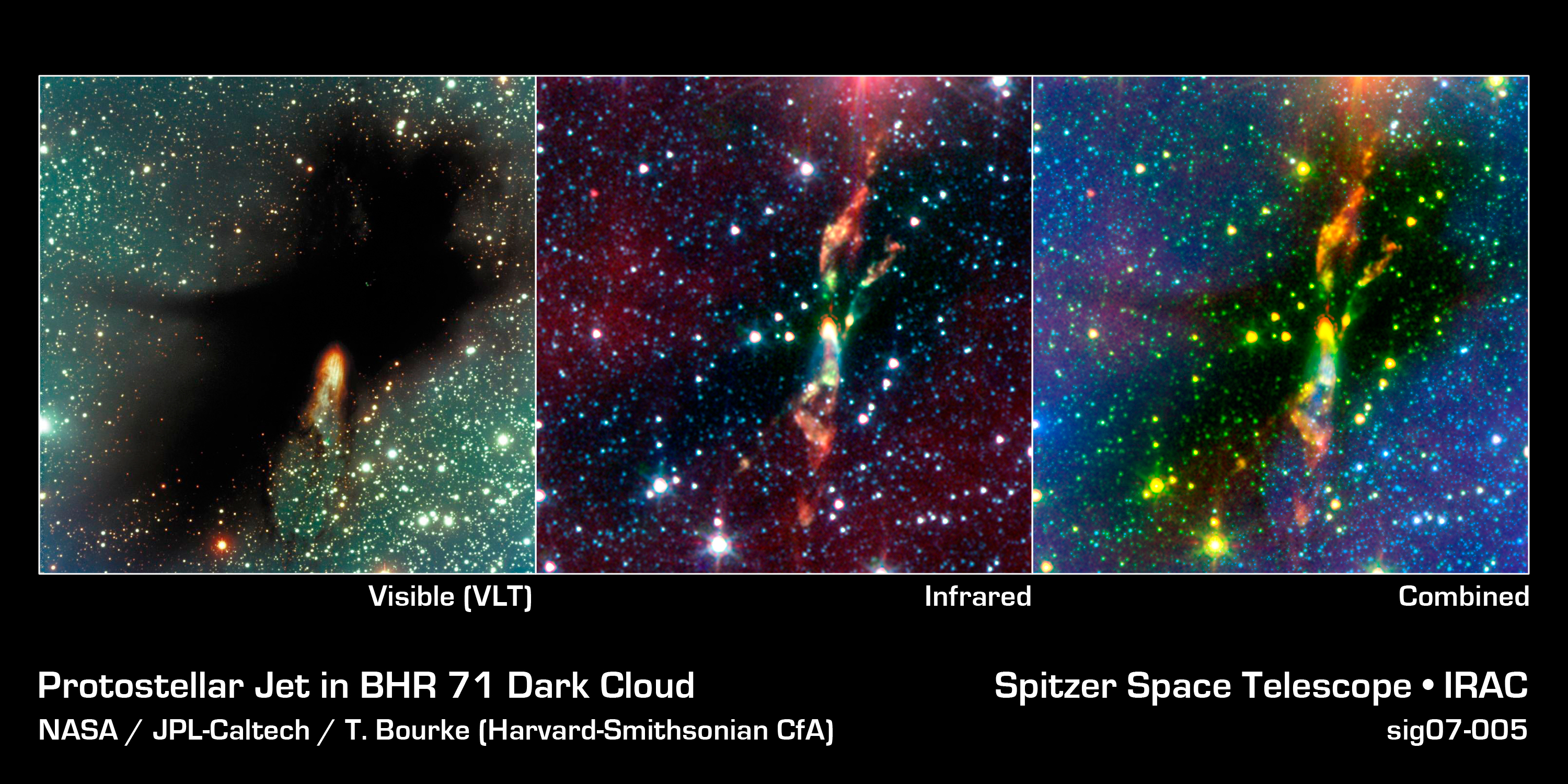
Left: Very Large Telescope image of BHR 71; middle: Spitzer image of BHR 71; right: combined image

In 1997 the Herbig-Haro objects 320 and 321 were discovered in BHR 71 with the help of sulfur [S II] imaging. The position of HH 320/321 in the 1997 paper are incorrect and were later corrected. A study using ALMA revealed that two of the outflows are partially colliding with each other. CO images show increased brightness at the collision area, the dispersion of velocity and the change in orientation for one outflow. This study also showed that IRS 2 is closer to us when compared to IRS1. The jet of IRS 1 shows a double-helical structure, which is evidence of removal of angular momentum in the system. IRS 2 on the other hand has a very collimated jet, showing knots, which is evidence for episodic accretion.
