= Delta Muscae =

Star in the constellation Musca

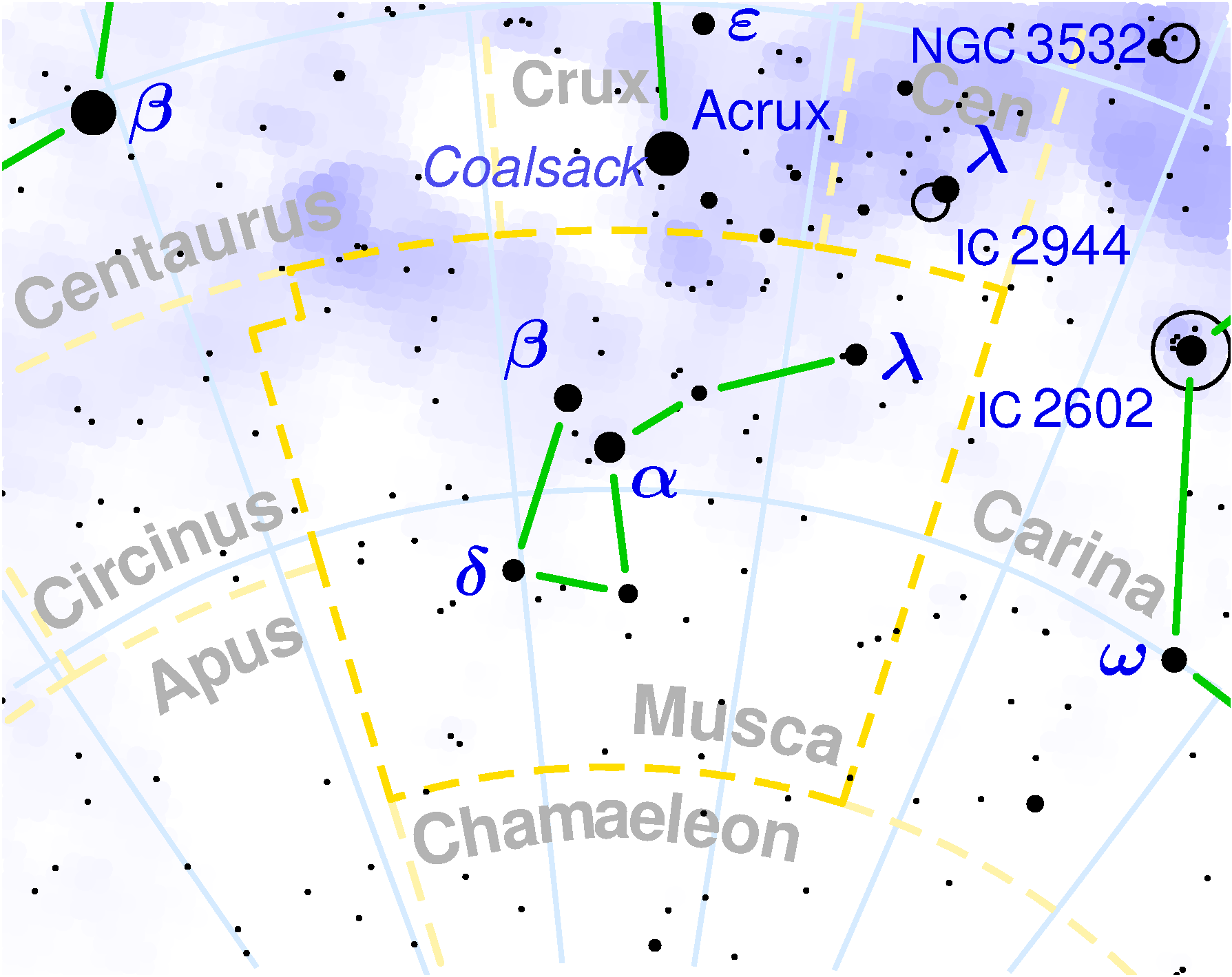
- Location of δ Muscae (circled)

Observation data Epoch J2000 Equinox ICRS
- Constellation: Musca
- Right ascension: 13^{h} 02^{m} 16.26474^{s}
- Declination: −71° 32′ 55.8752″
- Apparent magnitude (V): +3.61

Characteristics
- Spectral type: K2III
- U−B color index: +1.26
- B−V color index: +1.18

Astrometry
Radial velocity (R_{v})	36.5±0.9 km/s
Proper motion (μ)	RA: 264.17 mas/yr Dec.: −22.75 mas/yr
Parallax (π)	35.88±0.44 mas
Distance	91 ± 1 ly (27.9 ± 0.3 pc)
Absolute magnitude (M_{V})	+1.38

Orbit
Period (P)	423.2±0.10 d
Semi-major axis (a)	12.1±0.35 mas
Eccentricity (e)	0.52±0.06
Inclination (i)	120±2.3°
Longitude of the node (Ω)	58±2.7°
Periastron epoch (T)	25,945±5.5 JD
Argument of periastron (ω) (secondary)	319±4.2°
Semi-amplitude (K_{1}) (primary)	8.8±0.38 km/s

Details

A
Mass	1.5 M_{☉}
Radius	8.6 R_{☉}
Luminosity	31 L_{☉}
Surface gravity (log g)	2.5 cgs
Temperature	4,500 K

B
Mass	0.4 M_{☉}

Other designations
- δ Mus, CD−70°997, FK5 487, GC 17672, HD 112985, HIP 63613, HR 4923, SAO 257000

Database references
SIMBAD	data

Delta Muscae, Latinized from δ Muscae, often catalogued as HD 112985, is a spectroscopic binary star system in the southern constellation of Musca (the Fly), at a distance of approximately 27.8 parsecs (91.0 light years). The main star is classified as a giant star with an orange tint. It is one of the stars given a Bayer designation by astronomer Johann Bayer. It was recorded in Bayer's 1603 publication Uranometria. In addition it is one of the main stars used in the visual formation of the Musca constellation.

== Distance and visibility ==
Based on research done by the European Space Agency for the Hipparcos Star Catalogue, Delta Muscae exhibits a parallax of 35.91 milliarcseconds. With this data, it can be calculated that Delta Muscae is situated at a distance of 27.8 parsecs, or 91.0 light years, from the sun.

Even though Delta Muscae is the closest star to Earth in the Musca constellation excluding the white dwarf Gliese 440, nearly 3800 stars are closer in proximity to the Earth as stated by the Gliese Catalogue of Nearby Stars, which includes stars within twenty-five parsecs of the Sun.

Delta Muscae is a star of the third magnitude (or 3.61(v) to be exact) when viewed from the Earth, and is visible to the naked eye in regions that lack dense light pollution.

== Stellar and system characteristics ==
Delta Muscae has a listed spectral type of K2III. The K2 portion of this designation specifies that Delta Muscae A is a class K2 star, meaning the light it emits is orange in color. The main star burns at a temperature cooler than the Sun, which is a G2 star. The second part of the classification, III, specifies that Delta Muscae is a giant star which has already left the main sequence of star life like the Sun.
