= Lambda Muscae =

Star in the constellation Musca

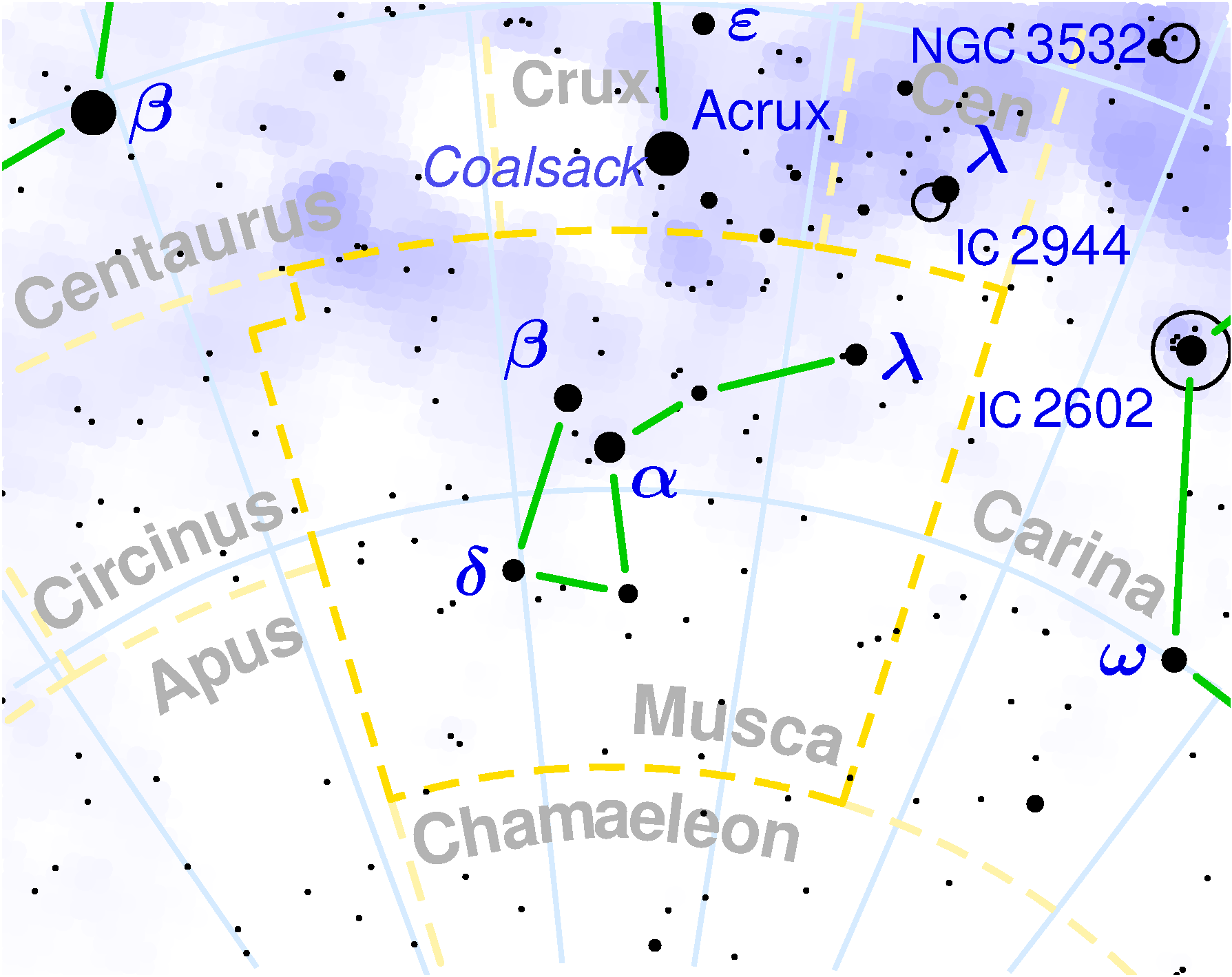
- Location of λ Muscae (circled)

Observation data Epoch J2000.0 Equinox ICRS
- Constellation: Musca
- Right ascension: 11^{h} 45^{m} 36.41916^{s}
- Declination: −66° 43′ 43.5440″
- Apparent magnitude (V): +3.63

Characteristics
- Evolutionary stage: main sequence
- Spectral type: A7 V
- U−B color index: +0.14
- B−V color index: +0.16
- R−I color index: 0.08
- Variable type: δ Sct

Astrometry
| Radial velocity (R_{v}) | +15.0±0.3 km/s |
| Proper motion (μ) | RA: −100.35 mas/yr Dec.: +33.49 mas/yr |
| Parallax (π) | 25.65±0.34 mas |
| Distance | 127 ± 2 ly (39.0 ± 0.5 pc) |
| Absolute magnitude (M_{V}) | +1.07 |

Details

Aa
| Mass | 2.28 M_{☉} |
| Radius | 3.7 R_{☉} |
| Luminosity | 40 L_{☉} |
| Surface gravity (log g) | 3.87 cgs |
| Temperature | 7,700 K |
| Rotational velocity (v sin i) | 57.7±1.7 km/s |
| Age | 700 Myr |

Ab
| Mass | 0.43 M_{☉} |

C
| Mass | 0.16 M_{☉} |

Other designations
- λ Mus, CPD−66°1640, FK5 442, GC 16131, HD 102249, HIP 57363, HR 4520, SAO 251575, CCDM J11456-6644A

Database references
| SIMBAD | data |

Lambda Muscae, Latinized from λ Muscae, and often catalogued HD 102249 or HIP 57363, is a triple star system and the fourth-brightest star in the Southern Hemisphere constellation of Musca (the Fly). Lambda Muscae visibly makes up the far end of the tail of the constellation Musca. It is one of the stars catalogued in astronomer Johann Bayer's 1603 publication Uranometria.

== Distance and visibility ==
Based on research done by the European Space Agency for the Hipparcos Star Catalogue, Lambda Muscae exhibits a parallax of 25.42 milliarcseconds. With this data it can be calculated that Lambda Muscae is situated at a distance of 39.3 parsecs, or 128.0 light years, away from the sun.

Lambda Muscae is a star of the third magnitude (or 3.68(v) to be exact) when viewed from the Earth, and is visible to the naked eye in regions that lack dense light pollution.

Lambda Muscae is the farthest right star in the visual constellation of Musca and is thus the tail of the fly.

== Stellar characteristics ==
The primary component has a listed spectral type of A7V. The A7 portion of this designation that Lambda Muscae Aa is a class A7 star, meaning the light it emits is bluish-white in color and burns at a temperature significantly hotter than the Sun, which is a G2 star. A7 stars are on the larger end of the Harvard spectral classification list, being only smaller and dimmer than Class-O and Class-B stars.

The other components of the system, the secondary and tertiary, are red dwarfs. They are separated by the primary by 1.65 and 6.4 astronomical units respectively.
