= Alpha Muscae =

Star in the constellation Musca

- Location of α Muscae (circled)

Observation data Epoch J2000.0 Equinox ICRS
- Constellation: Musca
- Right ascension: 12^{h} 37^{m} 11.01789^{s}
- Declination: −69° 08′ 08.0332″
- Apparent magnitude (V): +2.69

Characteristics
- Evolutionary stage: main sequence
- Spectral type: B2 IV–V
- U−B color index: −0.854
- B−V color index: −0.219
- Variable type: β Cep

Astrometry
Radial velocity (R_{v})	+13 km/s
Proper motion (μ)	RA: −40.20 mas/yr Dec.: −12.80 mas/yr
Parallax (π)	10.34±0.11 mas
Distance	315 ± 3 ly (97 ± 1 pc)
Absolute magnitude (M_{V})	−2.2

Details
Mass	8.8±0.1 M_{☉}
Radius	5.22 ± 0.06 (Note: Calculated, using the Stefan-Boltzmann law and the star's effective temperature and luminosity, with respect to the solar nominal effective temperature of 5,772 K: $$\sqrt{\biggl(\frac{5,772}{20,400}\biggr)^4 \cdot 10^{3.63}} = 5.22\ R_\odot.$$) R_{☉}
Luminosity	4,270±100 L_{☉}
Surface gravity (log g)	4.06 cgs
Temperature	20,400 K
Rotational velocity (v sin i)	114 km/s
Age	18.3±3.2 Myr

Other designations
- α Mus, CD−68 1104, CPD−68 1702, FK5 474, HD 109668, HIP 61585, HR 4798, SAO 251974

Database references
SIMBAD	data

Alpha Muscae, Latinized from α Muscae, is a star in the southern circumpolar constellation of Musca. With an apparent visual magnitude of +2.7, it is the brightest star in the constellation. The distance to this star has been determined using parallax measurements, giving an estimate of about 315 light-years (97 parsecs) from Earth.

With a stellar classification of B2 IV-V, this star appears to be in the process of evolving away from the main sequence of stars like the Sun and turning a subgiant star, as the supply of hydrogen at its core becomes exhausted. It is larger than the Sun, with nearly nine times the mass and 5.2 times the radius. This star is radiating around 4,300 times as much luminosity as the Sun from its outer atmosphere at an effective temperature of 20,400 K, giving it the blue-white hue of a B-type star.

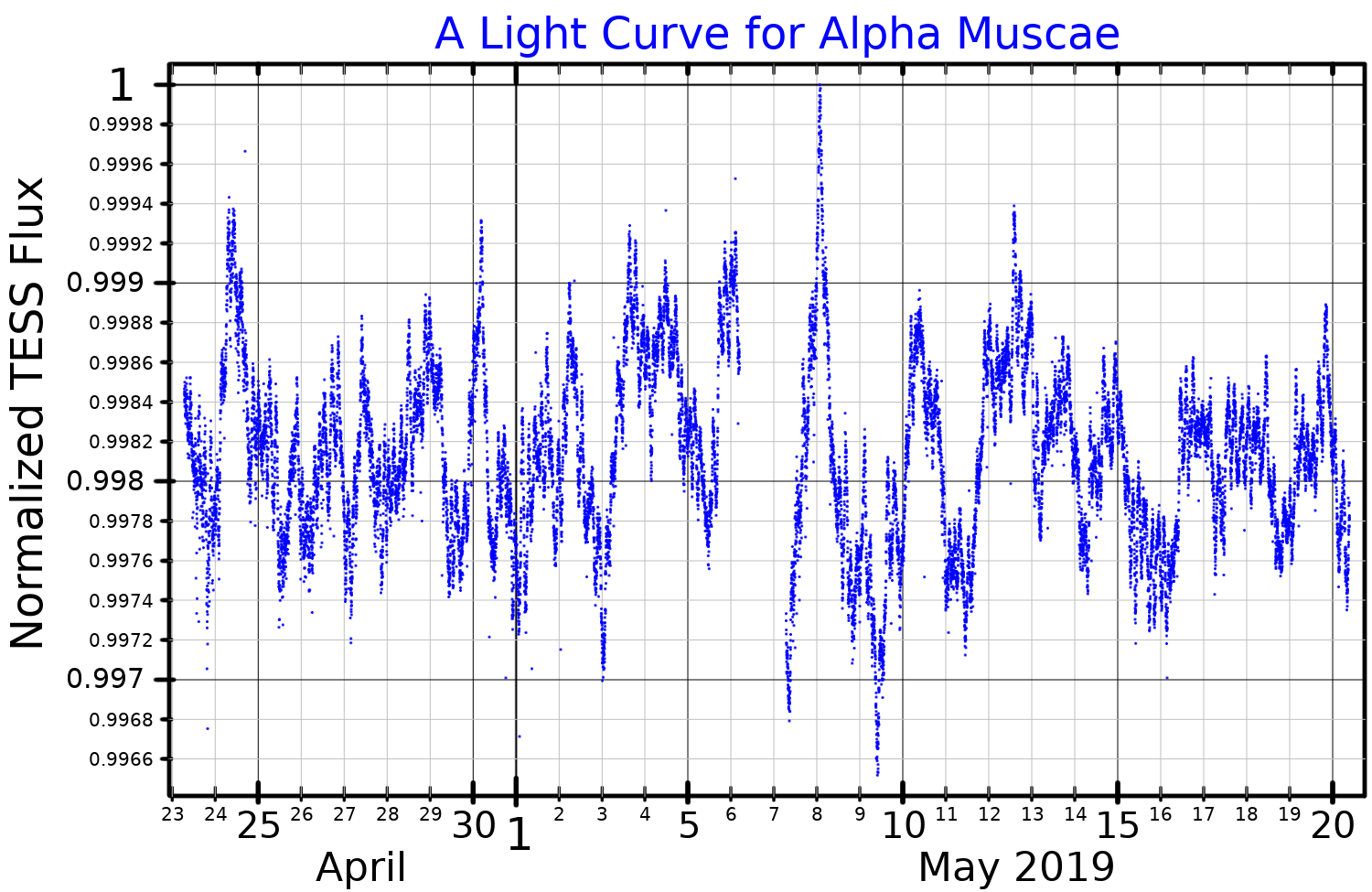
A light curve for Alpha Muscae, plotted from TESS data

Alpha Muscae appears to be a Beta Cephei variable star. Telting and colleagues report it as a Beta Cephei with a high degree of confidence as they found regular pulsations in its spectrum in a high-resolution spectroscopy study published in 2006, although Stankov and Handler (2005) listed it as a poor or rejected candidate in their Catalog of Galactic β Cephei Stars. The International Variable Star Index lists it as a Beta Cephei variable which varies in brightness from magnitude 2.68 to 2.73, with a period of 2.17 hours. Alpha Muscae is rotating rapidly with a projected rotational velocity of 114 km s^{−1} and has an estimated age of about 18 million years.

This star is a proper motion member of the Lower Centaurus–Crux sub-group in the Scorpius–Centaurus OB association, the nearest such association of co-moving massive stars to the Sun. Alpha Muscae has a peculiar velocity of 10 km s^{−1}, which, while high, is not enough for it to be considered a runaway star.

In the culture of the indigenous Wardaman people of Australia, this star has the name Burangalul, referring to the "forehead band" of the boomerang constellation Buran, which is equivalent to Musca.
