= Musca =

Constellation in the southern celestial hemisphere

- Constellation
- List of stars in Musca
- Abbreviation: Mus
- Genitive: Muscae
- Pronunciation: /ˈmʌskə/; genitive /ˈmʌsiː/
- Symbolism: the Fly
- Right ascension: 11^{h} 19.3^{m} –13^{h} 51.1^{m}
- Declination: −64.64°–−75.68°
- Quadrant: SQ3
- Area: 138 sq. deg. (77th)
- Main stars: 6
- Bayer/Flamsteed stars: 13
- Stars brighter than 3.00^{m}: 1
- Stars within 10.00 pc (32.62 ly): 1
- Brightest star: α Mus (2.69^{m})
- Nearest star: Gliese 440
- Messier objects: 0
- Bordering constellations: Apus; Carina; Centaurus; Chamaeleon; Circinus; Crux
- Visible at latitudes between +10° and −90°. Best visible at 21:00 (9 p.m.) during the month of May.

Musca (Latin for 'the fly') is a small constellation in the deep southern sky. It was one of 12 constellations created by Petrus Plancius from the observations of Pieter Dirkszoon Keyser and Frederick de Houtman, and it first appeared on a celestial globe 35 cm (14 in) in diameter published in 1597 (or 1598) in Amsterdam by Plancius and Jodocus Hondius. The first depiction of this constellation in a celestial atlas was in Johann Bayer's Uranometria of 1603. It was also known as Apis (Latin for 'the bee') for 200 years. Musca remains below the horizon for most Northern Hemisphere observers.

Many of the constellation's brighter stars are members of the Scorpius–Centaurus association, a loose group of hot blue-white stars that appears to share a common origin and motion across the Milky Way. These include Alpha, Beta, Gamma, Zeta^{2} and (probably) Eta Muscae, as well as HD 100546, a blue-white Herbig Ae/Be star that is surrounded by a complex debris disk containing a large planet or brown dwarf and possible protoplanet. Two further star systems have been found to have planets. The constellation also contains two cepheid variables visible to the naked eye. Theta Muscae is a triple star system, the brightest member of which is a Wolf–Rayet star.

== History ==
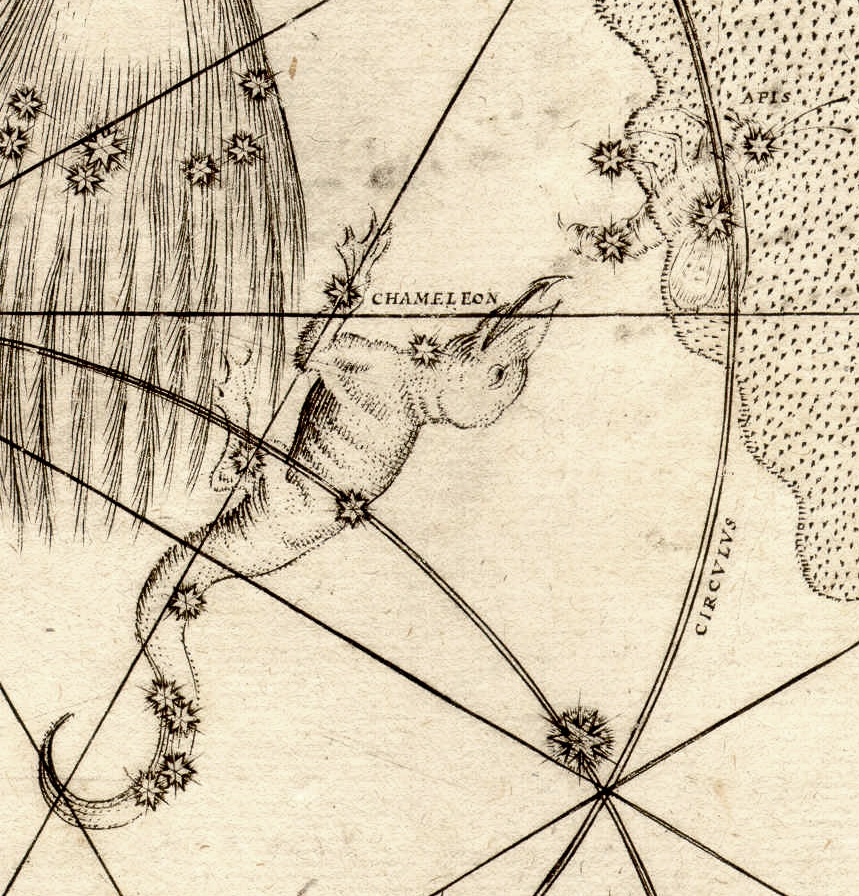
Musca (as Apis) can be seen in the upper right of this extract from Bayer's Uranometria of 1603

Musca was one of the 12 constellations established by the astronomer Petrus Plancius from the observations of the southern sky by the Dutch explorers Pieter Dirkszoon Keyser and Frederick de Houtman, who had sailed on the first Dutch trading expedition, known as the Eerste Schipvaart, to the East Indies. De Houtman included it in his southern star catalogue in 1598 under the Dutch name De Vlieghe, "The Fly". They assigned four stars to the constellation, with a star that would be later designated as Beta Muscae marking the head, Gamma the body, and Alpha and Delta the left and right wings, respectively. It first appeared on a 35-cm-diameter (14-in) celestial globe published in 1598 in Amsterdam by Plancius with Jodocus Hondius, though was unnamed. The first depiction of this constellation in a celestial atlas was in the German cartographer Johann Bayer's Uranometria of 1603, though Bayer termed it Apis— "the Bee", a name by which it was known for the next two centuries. A 1603 celestial globe by Willem Blaeu depicts it as providing nourishment for the nearby constellation Chamaeleon—its tongue trying to catch the insect.

The French explorer and astronomer Nicolas Louis de Lacaille called it la Mouche on the 1756 version of his planisphere of the southern skies. Jean Fortin retained the French name in 1776 for his Atlas Céleste, while Lacaille Latinised the name for his revised Coelum Australe Stelliferum in 1763. Lacaille renamed it to Musca Australis, the Southern Fly—Australis, since it counterparted the now discarded constellation of Musca Borealis composed of a few stars in Aries, and to avoid confusion with Apus. Today, the name is simply Musca. It is the only official constellation depicting an insect.

The Kalapalo people of Mato Grosso state in Brazil called Alpha and Beta Muscae (along with Beta and Kappa Crucis) Kutsu anangagï "Ornate Hawk-Eagle's double flutes". The Wardaman people of the Northern Territory in Australia perceived the main stars of Musca as a ceremonial boomerang, part of the Central Arena—a sacred area surrounding the constellation Crux that depicts the lightning creation beings and where they teach Wardaman customs; Alpha and Beta also signified a ceremonial headband, while Gamma and Delta represented two armbands. In central Australia, the Arrernte and Luritja peoples living in on a mission in Hermannsburg viewed the sky as divided between them, east of the Milky Way representing Arrernte camps and west denoting Luritja camps. The stars of Musca, along with Fomalhaut, Alpha Pavonis, and Alpha and Beta Gruis, were all claimed by the Arrernte.

== Characteristics ==
Musca is bordered by Crux to the north, Carina to the west, Chamaeleon to the south, Apus and Circinus to the east, and Centaurus to the northeast. Covering 138 square degrees and 0.335% of the night sky, it ranks 77th of the 88 constellations in size. The three-letter abbreviation for the constellation, as adopted by the International Astronomical Union in 1922, is "Mus". The official constellation boundaries, as set by Belgian astronomer Eugène Delporte in 1930, are defined by a polygon of six segments. In the equatorial coordinate system, the right ascension coordinates of these borders lie between 11^{h} 19.3^{m} and 13^{h} 51.1^{m} , while the declination coordinates are between −64.64° and −75.68°. The whole constellation is visible to observers south of latitude 14°N. (Note: While parts of the constellation technically rise above the horizon to observers between 14°N and 25°N, stars within a few degrees of the horizon are essentially unobservable.)

== Features ==
=== Stars ===
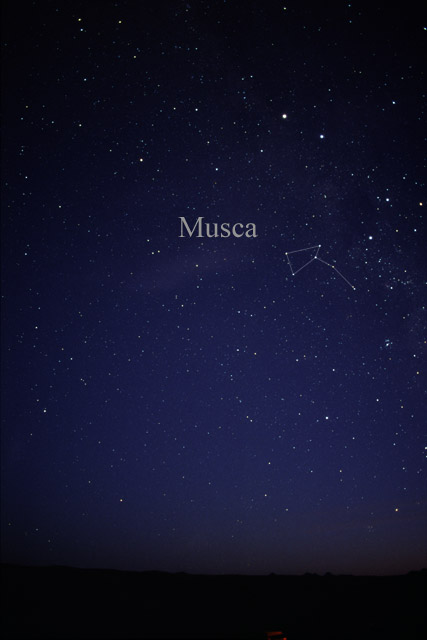
Musca as seen by the naked eye

Lacaille charted and designated 10 stars with the Bayer designations Alpha to Kappa in 1756. He catalogued stars that became Lambda and Mu, but did not designate them as he considered them informes as they lay outside the asterism proper. Francis Baily considered them part of Musca, and Gould gave them their Bayer designations. Baily also dropped Kappa, which he felt was too faint to warrant a name, and designated two adjacent stars as Zeta^{1} and Zeta^{2}. These last two stars are 1° apart, quite far to be sharing a Bayer designation. Lacaille had originally labelled the fainter one as Zeta, while Baily presupposed he had meant to label the brighter one. Reluctant to remove Lacaille's designation, he gave them both the Zeta designation. Altogether there are 62 stars brighter than magnitude 6.5 in the constellation.

The pattern of the brightest stars resembles that of Ursa Minor, in that the stars form a pattern reminiscent of a bowl with a handle. Lying south-southeast of Acrux in neighbouring Crux is Alpha Muscae. It is the brightest star in the constellation with an apparent magnitude of 2.7. Lying around 310 light-years away, it is a blue-white star of spectral type B2IV-V that is around 4520 times as luminous and 8 times as massive as the Sun. The star is a Beta Cephei variable with about 4.7 times the Sun's diameter, and pulsates every 2.2 hours, varying by 1% in brightness. A nearby star of magnitude 13 may or may not be a companion star. Marking the fly's tail is Gamma Muscae, a blue-white star of spectral type B5V that varies between magnitudes 3.84 and 3.86 over a period of 2.7 days. It is a variable of a different type, classed as a slowly pulsating B star, a type of variable. It is around five times as massive as the Sun.

Beta Muscae is a binary star system around 341 light-years distant that is composed of two blue-white main-sequence stars of spectral types B2V and B3V that orbit each other every 194 years. They are eight and six times as massive as the Sun, respectively, and have about 3.5 times its diameter. Zeta^{2} Muscae is a white main sequence star of spectral type A5V around 330 light-years distant from Earth. It is part of a triple star system with faint companions at 0.5 and 32.4 arc seconds distance. Eta Muscae is a multiple star system, the two main components forming an eclipsing binary that has a combined spectral type of B8V and magnitude of 4.77 that dips by 0.05 magnitude every 2.39 days. Alpha, Beta, Gamma, HD 103079, Zeta^{2} and (likely) Eta are all members of the Lower Centaurus Crux subgroup of the Scorpius–Centaurus association, a group of predominantly hot blue-white stars that share a common origin and proper motion across the galaxy.

Delta and Epsilon mark the fly's left wing and right wing, respectively. With an apparent magnitude of 3.62, Delta is an orange giant of spectral type K2III located around 91 light-years away. Epsilon Muscae is a red giant of spectral type M5III and semiregular variable that ranges between magnitudes 3.99 and 4.31 over approximately 40 days. It has expanded to 130 times the Sun's diameter and 1800 to 2300 its luminosity. It was a star originally 1.5 to 2 times as massive as the Sun. Although of a similar distance—around 302 light-years—to the stars of the Lower Centaurus Crux subgroup, it is moving much faster at around 100 km/s and does not share a common origin. To the northwest lies Mu Muscae, an orange giant of spectral type K4III that varies between apparent magnitude 4.71 and 4.76, and has been classified as a slow, irregular variable. Near Mu is Lambda Muscae, the third-brightest star in the constellation and a white main-sequence star of spectral type A7V around 128 light-years distant from Earth.

Located near Alpha is R Muscae, a classical Cepheid variable ranging from apparent magnitude 5.93 to 6.73 over 7.5 days. It is a yellow-white supergiant ranging between spectral types F7Ib and G2Ib, located around 2037 light-years away. S Muscae is likewise a classical Cepheid, a yellow-white supergiant ranging between spectral types F6Ib and G0Ib and magnitudes 5.89 to 6.49 over a period of 9.66 days. A luminous star around 5.9 times as massive as the Sun, it is a binary star with a blue-white main-sequence star companion likely to be of spectral type B3V to B5V with a mass of just over 5 solar masses, one of the hottest and brightest companions of a cepheid known. The two stars orbit each other every 505 days.

Theta Muscae is a triple star system thought to be around 7,500 light-years distant. It consists of a spectroscopic binary system composed of the Wolf–Rayet star (spectral type: WC5 or 6) and an O-type main-sequence star (spectral type: O6 or O7) that orbit each other every 19 days and a blue supergiant (spectral type: O9.5/B0Iab) set about 46 milliarcseconds apart from them. If the system's estimated distance from Earth is accurate, the binary stars are about 0.5 astronomical units (AU) apart and the supergiant about 100 AU apart from them. All three are highly luminous; combined, they are likely to be over a million times as luminous as the Sun. TU Muscae is a binary star system located around 15,500 light-years away made up of two hot, luminous, blue main-sequence stars of spectral types O7.5V and O9.5V, with masses 23 and 15 times that of the Sun. The stars are so close that they are in contact with each other (overcontact binary) and are classed as a Beta Lyrae variable as their light varies from Earth as they eclipse each other. The system ranges from apparent magnitude 8.17 to 8.75 over around 1.4 days.

Also known as Nova Muscae 1983, GQ Muscae is a binary system consisting of a white dwarf and small star that is about 10% as massive as the Sun. The two orbit each other every 1.4 hours. The white dwarf accumulates material from its companion star via its accretion disc. After a certain amount has accumulated, the star erupts, as it did in 1983, reaching a magnitude of 7.2. Discovered with a magnitude of 7.1 on 18 January 1983, it was the first nova from which X-rays were detected. The soft X-ray transient GRS 1124-683 (also known as Nova Muscae 1991) is a binary object consisting of an orange main-sequence star (GU Muscae) of spectral type K3V–K4V and a black hole of around six solar masses. During the 1991 outburst which led to its discovery, radiation was produced through a process of positron annihilation. GR Muscae is an X-ray source composed of a neutron star of between 1.2 and 1.8 times the mass of the Sun and a low-mass star likely to be around the mass of the Sun in close orbit. Finally, SY Muscae is a symbiotic star system composed of a red giant and white dwarf, where although the larger star is transferring mass to the smaller, no periodic eruption occurs nor does an accretion disc form. The star system varies in magnitude from 10.2 to 12.7 over a period of 624.5 days. V415 Muscae is a nova that had an outburst on 8 June 2022 with an apparent magnitude of +8.7.

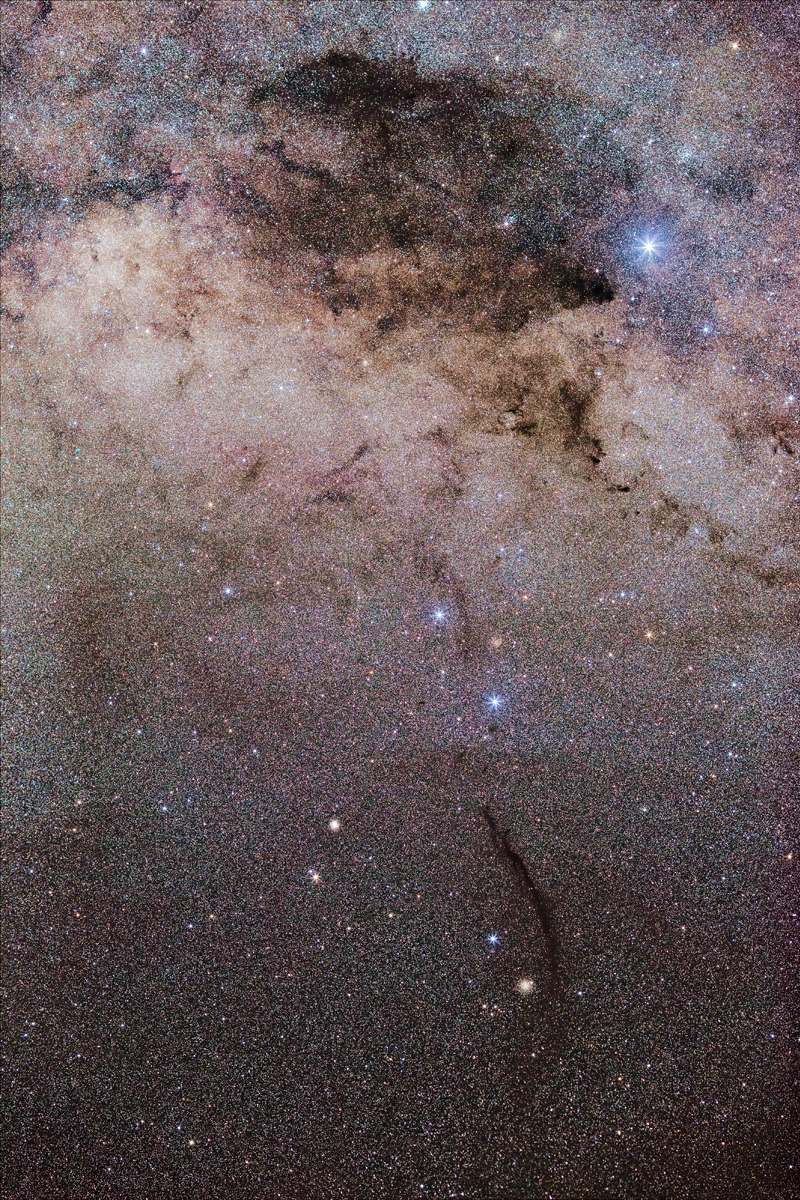
The Coalsack Nebula can be seen as the large, dark region near the top of the photo. It extends into the northeast of Musca. The vertical dark column in the lower right of the image is the Dark Doodad Nebula.

Three star systems have been discovered to have exoplanets. HD 111232 is a yellow main-sequence star around 78% as massive as the Sun around 95 light-years distant. It has a planet (HD 111232 b) around 6.8 times the mass of Jupiter that has an orbital period around 1143 days. HD 112410 is a yellow giant of spectral type G8III located around 439 light-years distant. With around 1.54 times the mass of the Sun, it is cooling and expanding along the red-giant branch, having left the main sequence after exhausting its core supply of hydrogen fuel. It has a substellar companion calculated to have a mass 9.2 times that of Jupiter and an orbital period of 124.6 days at a distance around 0.57 AU. Yet another member of the Lower Centaurus Crux subgroup, HD 100546 is a young, blue-white Herbig Ae/Be star of spectral type B9V that has yet to settle on the main sequence—the closest of these stars to Earth around 320 light-years distant. It is surrounded by a circumstellar debris disk from a distance of 0.2 to 4 AU, and again from 13 AU out to a few hundred AU, with evidence for a protoplanet forming at a distance around 47 AU. A gap exists between 4 and 13 AU, which appears to contain a large planet around 20 times the mass of Jupiter, although further examination of the disk profile indicates it might be a more massive object such as a brown dwarf or more than one planet. LP 145-141 is a white dwarf located 15 light-years distant—the fourth-closest to the Solar System. It is considered a good candidate to look for Jupiter-like planets, on account if its proximity and mass.

=== Deep-sky objects ===
Located on the border with Circinus is the unusual planetary nebula NGC 5189, estimated to be around 1750 light-years away from Earth. Its complex structure is due to multiple ejections of material from the ageing central star, which are distorted by the presence of a likely binary companion. Located 2.4° east of Eta Muscae is the magnitude-12.9 Engraved Hourglass Nebula (MyCn 18), which lies about 8000 light-years distant from Earth. To Eta's west lies IC 4191, a compact bluish planetary nebula of magnitude 10.6, thought to lie around 10,750 light-years away from Earth. West of Epsilon Muscae is NGC 4071, a large, diffuse planetary nebula of magnitude 12.7 with a magnitude 12 central star, thought to lie around 4000 light-years away from Earth. The Coalsack Nebula is a dark nebula located mainly in neighbouring Crux that intrudes into Musca. NGC 4463 is an open cluster located on its southwestern border. Around five light-years across, it is located around 3400 light-years away.

The comparatively old globular cluster NGC 4833 near Delta Muscae was catalogued by Lacaille in 1755. It is 21,200 light-years distant and somewhat obscured by dust clouds near the galactic plane. The globular cluster NGC 4372 near Gamma Muscae is fainter and likewise partially obscured by dust, but spans more arc minutes. It is 18,900 light-years away from Earth and 23,000 light-years distant from the centre of the Milky Way. Its extremely low metallicity indicates it is very old—one of the oldest clusters in the Milky Way. Extending south from it is the Dark Doodad Nebula, resembling a dark L-shaped river through a bright field of stars. Another dark nebula in the constellation is BHR 71.

== See also ==
- IAU-recognized constellations
- Musca (Chinese astronomy)
