= Zeta2 Muscae =

Star in the constellation Musca

ζ^{2} Muscae
- Location of ζ^{2} Muscae (circled in red)

Observation data Epoch J2000.0 Equinox ICRS
- Constellation: Musca
- Right ascension: 12^{h} 22^{m} 07.34002^{s}
- Declination: −67° 31′ 19.5871″
- Apparent magnitude (V): 5.14 + 8.71 + 10.7

Characteristics
- Spectral type: A5 V + G8-K0V
- U−B color index: +0.13
- B−V color index: +0.19

Astrometry
Radial velocity (R_{v})	−17.0 km/s
Proper motion (μ)	RA: −30.50 mas/yr Dec.: -6.10 mas/yr
Parallax (π)	9.89±0.34 mas
Distance	330 ± 10 ly (101 ± 3 pc)
Absolute magnitude (M_{V})	+0.13

Details

ζ^{2} Muscae A
Luminosity	66.7 L_{☉}
Temperature	7,400 K

Other designations
- CPD−66°1747, FK5 2990, HD 107566, HIP 60320, HR 4703, SAO 251866.

Database references
SIMBAD	data

Zeta^{2} Muscae, Latinized from ζ^{2} Muscae, is a star in the southern constellation of Musca. Its apparent magnitude is 5.16. This is a white main sequence star of spectral type A5V around 330 light-years distant from Earth. Like several other stars in the constellation, it is a member of the Lower Centaurus–Crux subgroup of the Scorpius–Centaurus association, a group of predominantly hot blue-white stars that share a common origin and proper motion across the galaxy. It is part of a triple star system with faint companions at 0.5 and 32.4 arc seconds distance. The former is an infrared source, the latter has a visual magnitude of 10.7.
