= Beta Muscae =

Star in the constellation Musca

- Location of β Musca (circled)

Observation data Epoch J2000.0 Equinox J2000.0 (ICRS)
- Constellation: Musca
- Right ascension: 12^{h} 46^{m} 16.80410^{s}
- Declination: −68° 06′ 29.2164″
- Apparent magnitude (V): 3.05 (3.51 + 4.01)

Characteristics
- Spectral type: B2 V + B3 V
- U−B color index: −0.766
- B−V color index: −0.198

Astrometry
Radial velocity (R_{v})	+42 km/s
Proper motion (μ)	RA: −41.97 mas/yr Dec.: −8.89 mas/yr
Parallax (π)	9.55±0.41 mas
Distance	340 ± 10 ly (105 ± 4 pc)
Absolute magnitude (M_{V})	−2.06

Orbit
Period (P)	194.28 yr
Semi-major axis (a)	0.969″
Eccentricity (e)	0.598
Inclination (i)	37.1°
Longitude of the node (Ω)	349.4°
Periastron epoch (T)	1857.50
Argument of periastron (ω) (secondary)	209.0°

Details

β Mus A
Mass	7.35 M_{☉}
Radius	3.5 R_{☉}
Luminosity	2,750 L_{☉}
Temperature	22,500 K
Age	15.1±1.2 Myr

β Mus B
Mass	6.40 M_{☉}
Radius	3.5 R_{☉}
Luminosity	1,200 L_{☉}
Temperature	18,500 K

Other designations
- β Mus, CPD−67 2064, HD 110879, HIP 62322, HR 4844, SAO 252019

Database references
SIMBAD	data

Beta Muscae, Latinized from β Muscae, is a binary star in the southern circumpolar constellation of Musca. With a combined apparent visual magnitude of 3.07, it is the second brightest star (or star system) in the constellation. Judging by the parallax results, it is located at a distance of roughly 340 ± 13 light-years (105 ± 4 parsecs) from the Earth.

This is a binary star system with a period of about 194 years at an orbital eccentricity of 0.6. As of 2007, the two stars had an angular separation of 1.206 arcseconds at a position angle of 35°. The components are main sequence stars of similar size and appearance. The primary component, β Muscae A, has an apparent magnitude of 3.51, a stellar classification of B2 V, and about 7.35 times the Sun's mass. The secondary component, β Muscae B, has an apparent magnitude of 4.01, a stellar classification of B3 V, and is about 6.40 times the mass of the Sun.

This is a confirmed member of the Scorpius–Centaurus association, which is a group of stars with similar ages, locations, and trajectories through space, implying that they formed together in the same molecular cloud. Beta Muscae is considered a runaway star system as it has a high peculiar velocity of 43.9 km s^{−1} relative to the normal galactic rotation. Runaway stars can be produced through several means, such as through an encounter with another binary star system. Binary systems form a relatively small fraction of the total population of runaway stars.
