= List of stars in Musca =

This is the list of notable stars in the constellation Musca, sorted by decreasing brightness.

| Name | B | Var | HD | HIP | RA | Dec | vis. mag. | abs. mag. | Dist. (ly) | Sp. class | Notes |
|---|---|---|---|---|---|---|---|---|---|---|---|
| α Mus | α | | 109668 | 61585 | 12^{h} 37^{m} 11.08^{s} | −69° 08′ 07.9″ | 2.69 | −2.17 | 306 | B2IV-V | β Cep variable, V_{max} = 2.68^{m}, V_{min} = 2.73^{m}, P = 0.0903 d; Member of the Lower Centaurus–Crux subgroup of the Scorpius–Centaurus association. |
| β Mus | β | | 110879 | 62322 | 12^{h} 46^{m} 16.87^{s} | −68° 06′ 29.1″ | 3.04 | −1.86 | 311 | B2V + B3V | Binary star, Member of the Lower Centaurus–Crux subgroup of the Scorpius–Centaurus association. |
| δ Mus | δ | | 112985 | 63613 | 13^{h} 02^{m} 15.78^{s} | −71° 32′ 55.7″ | 3.61 | 1.39 | 90.8 | K2III | Binary star |
| λ Mus | λ | | 102249 | 57363 | 11^{h} 45^{m} 36.57^{s} | −66° 43′ 43.8″ | 3.68 | 0.66 | 128 | A7III | |
| γ Mus | γ | | 109026 | 61199 | 12^{h} 32^{m} 28.11^{s} | −72° 07′ 58.7″ | 3.84 | −1.14 | 324 | B5V | 53 Persei variable, V_{max} = 3.84^{m}, V_{min} = 3.86^{m}, P = 2.72926 d |
| ε Mus | ε | | 106849 | 59929 | 12^{h} 17^{m} 34.64^{s} | −67° 57′ 38.4″ | 4.06 | −0.77 | 302 | M5III | semiregular variable, V_{max} = 3.99^{m}, V_{min} = 4.31^{m}, P = 40 d |
| μ Mus | μ | | 102584 | 57581 | 11^{h} 48^{m} 14.49^{s} | −66° 48′ 53.5″ | 4.75 | −0.86 | 432 | K4III | slow irregular variable, V_{max} = 4.71^{m}, V_{min} = 4.76^{m} |
| η Mus | η | | 114911 | 64661 | 13^{h} 15^{m} 15.00^{s} | −67° 53′ 40.4″ | 4.79 | −0.68 | 405 | B8V | Algol variable, V_{max} = 4.76^{m}, V_{min} = 4.81^{m}, P = 2.3963 d; probable member of the Lower Centaurus–Crux subgroup of the Scorpius–Centaurus association. |
| HD 115211 | | | 115211 | 64820 | 13^{h} 17^{m} 13.03^{s} | −66° 47′ 00.3″ | 4.86 | −2.94 | 1185 | K2Ib/II | suspected variable |
| HD 103079 | | | 103079 | 57851 | 11^{h} 51^{m} 51.27^{s} | −65° 12′ 21.2″ | 4.89 | −0.19 | 338 | B4V | Binary star |
| HD 102839 | | | 102839 | 57696 | 11^{h} 49^{m} 56.63^{s} | −70° 13′ 32.8″ | 4.98 | −3.27 | 1455 | G5Ib | |
| GT Mus | | GT | 101379 | 56862 | 11^{h} 39^{m} 29.63^{s} | −65° 23′ 51.9″ | 5.01 | −1.17 | 561 | G2III + A | Algol and RS CVn variable, V_{max} = 4.96^{m}, V_{min} = 5.23^{m}, P = 2.75459 d |
| ι^{1} Mus | ι^{1} | | 116244 | 65468 | 13^{h} 25^{m} 07.36^{s} | −74° 53′ 15.0″ | 5.04 | 0.85 | 225 | K0III | |
| HD 99104 | | | 99104 | 55597 | 11^{h} 23^{m} 21.43^{s} | −64° 57′ 17.0″ | 5.09 | −0.73 | 475 | B5V | Double system with HD 99103. |
| ζ^{2} Mus | ζ^{2} | | 107566 | 60320 | 12^{h} 22^{m} 07.39^{s} | −67° 31′ 19.5″ | 5.15 | 0.09 | 336 | Am | Double system, Member of the Lower Centaurus–Crux subgroup of the Scorpius–Centaurus association. |
| λ Cha | (λ) | | 105340 | 59151 | 12^{h} 07^{m} 50.09^{s} | −75° 22′ 01.4″ | 5.17 | −0.47 | 438 | K2II/III | |
| HD 104878 | | | 104878 | 58884 | 12^{h} 04^{m} 38.95^{s} | −68° 19′ 44.0″ | 5.34 | 0.25 | 339 | A0V | Member of the Lower Centaurus–Crux subgroup of the Scorpius–Centaurus association. |
| θ Mus | θ | | 113904 | 64094 | 13^{h} 08^{m} 07.16^{s} | −65° 18′ 21.7″ | 5.44 | −12.17 | ~7000 | WC6 + O9.5I | Eclipsing triple system, one component is a Wolf–Rayet star, V_{max} = 5.5^{m}, V_{min} = 5.52^{m}, P = 18.341 d |
| HD 99264 | | | 99264 | 55657 | 11^{h} 24^{m} 11.18^{s} | −72° 15′ 23.8″ | 5.55 | −1.61 | 883 | B2IV-V | |
| HD 111315 | | | 111315 | 62608 | 12^{h} 49^{m} 44.95^{s} | −71° 59′ 10.5″ | 5.55 | −0.49 | 526 | G8Ib/II | |
| HD 116458 | κ | | 116458 | 65522 | 13^{h} 25^{m} 50.40^{s} | −70° 37′ 38.1″ | 5.65 | −0.12 | 464 | Ap | variable star, ΔV = 0.010^{m}, P = 149.25373 d |
| ζ^{1} Mus | ζ^{1} | | 107567 | 60329 | 12^{h} 22^{m} 12.03^{s} | −68° 18′ 25.9″ | 5.73 | 0.31 | 396 | K0III | Double system |
| HD 108970 | | | 108970 | 61181 | 12^{h} 32^{m} 09.90^{s} | −73° 00′ 03.8″ | 5.88 | 0.78 | 341 | K1III | |
| HD 100382 | | | 100382 | 56287 | 11^{h} 32^{m} 20.00^{s} | −66° 57′ 42.6″ | 5.89 | 1.09 | 298 | K1IIICN... | |
| HD 104600 | | | 104600 | 58720 | 12^{h} 02^{m} 37.76^{s} | −69° 11′ 32.2″ | 5.89 | 1.01 | 308 | B9V | variable star, ΔV = 0.004^{m}, P = 0.3 d; member of the Lower Centaurus–Crux subgroup of the Scorpius–Centaurus association. |
| HD 114570 | | | 114570 | 64466 | 13^{h} 12^{m} 48.77^{s} | −66° 13′ 36.4″ | 5.91 | 1.20 | 285 | A0V(n) | |
| HD 114371 | | | 114371 | 64390 | 13^{h} 11^{m} 51.38^{s} | −69° 56′ 31.3″ | 5.92 | 2.70 | 144 | F3IV/V | Double system |
| HD 112219 | | | 112219 | 63165 | 12^{h} 56^{m} 31.72^{s} | −72° 11′ 06.7″ | 5.93 | −0.72 | 698 | G8III | |
| LS Mus | | LS | 113120 | 63688 | 13^{h} 03^{m} 05.36^{s} | −71° 28′ 32.6″ | 5.93 | −2.49 | 1575 | B1.5IIIne | Be star |
| HD 101162 | | | 101162 | 56727 | 11^{h} 37^{m} 48.51^{s} | −67° 37′ 13.3″ | 5.94 | 0.80 | 348 | K0III | |
| HD 105151 | | | 105151 | 59050 | 12^{h} 06^{m} 23.08^{s} | −65° 42′ 33.9″ | 5.95 | −0.25 | 566 | G8/K0III | Binary star |
| HD 115439 | | | 115439 | 64994 | 13^{h} 19^{m} 18.99^{s} | −72° 02′ 07.7″ | 6.04 | 0.37 | 445 | K3III | |
| S Mus | | S | 106111 | 59551 | 12^{h} 12^{m} 47.03^{s} | −70° 09′ 06.4″ | 6.05 | −2.44 | 1630 | F6Ib | Cepheid variable, V_{max} = 5.89^{m}, V_{min} = 6.49^{m}, P = 9.66007 d |
| HD 106797 | | | 106797 | 59898 | 12^{h} 17^{m} 06.36^{s} | −65° 41′ 34.6″ | 6.06 | 1.00 | 335 | A0V | Member of the Lower Centaurus–Crux subgroup of the Scorpius–Centaurus association. |
| HD 115149 | | | 115149 | 64790 | 13^{h} 16^{m} 45.05^{s} | −65° 08′ 17.3″ | 6.06 | 3.11 | 127 | F5V | |
| HD 115967 | | | 115967 | 65289 | 13^{h} 22^{m} 52.62^{s} | −72° 08′ 48.0″ | 6.06 | −0.74 | 746 | B6V | Binary star; suspected variable, V_{max} = 6.05^{m}, V_{min} = 6.16^{m} |
| HD 99872 | | | 99872 | 55979 | 11^{h} 28^{m} 18.46^{s} | −72° 28′ 26.3″ | 6.09 | −0.74 | 758 | B3V | suspected variable |
| HD 117025 | | | 117025 | 65783 | 13^{h} 29^{m} 07.98^{s} | −64° 40′ 32.8″ | 6.09 | 1.36 | 288 | A2m | |
| BO Mus | | BO | 109372 | 61404 | 12^{h} 34^{m} 54.46^{s} | −67° 45′ 24.8″ | 6.11 | −1.33 | 1003 | M6II/III | semiregular variable, V_{max} = 5.3^{m}, V_{min} = 6.56^{m}, P = 132.4 d |
| HD 118344 | | | 118344 | 66574 | 13^{h} 38^{m} 45.83^{s} | −70° 26′ 41.1″ | 6.11 | 0.47 | 438 | K3III | |
| HD 110716 | | | 110716 | 62212 | 12^{h} 45^{m} 02.07^{s} | −68° 49′ 50.7″ | 6.16 | −2.71 | 1940 | F6Ia | |
| HD 116890 | | EZ | 116890 | 65755 | 13^{h} 28^{m} 46.82^{s} | −69° 37′ 37.6″ | 6.17 | −0.48 | 698 | B8V | α² CVn variable, ΔV = 0.09^{m}, P = 4.3127 d |
| HD 107301 | | | 107301 | 60183 | 12^{h} 20^{m} 28.28^{s} | −65° 50′ 33.5″ | 6.20 | 1.22 | 323 | B9V | Member of the Lower Centaurus–Crux subgroup of the Scorpius–Centaurus association. |
| HD 106676 | | | 106676 | 59851 | 12^{h} 16^{m} 23.87^{s} | −72° 36′ 52.1″ | 6.21 | 1.16 | 333 | A0V | |
| KY Mus | | KY | 109867 | 61703 | 12^{h} 38^{m} 52.37^{s} | −67° 11′ 35.0″ | 6.22 | | | B1Ia | α Cyg variable |
| HD 105138 | | | 105138 | 59046 | 12^{h} 06^{m} 19.93^{s} | −68° 39′ 05.0″ | 6.23 | −2.58 | 1884 | G3Ib | |
| HD 98672 | | | 98672 | 55308 | 11^{h} 19^{m} 36.58^{s} | −75° 08′ 32.8″ | 6.26 | 0.20 | 532 | B9.5/A0V | |
| FH Mus | | FH | 110020 | 61796 | 12^{h} 39^{m} 55.90^{s} | −66° 30′ 40.0″ | 6.26 | 1.09 | 353 | B8V | rotating ellipsoidal variable, ΔV = 0.03^{m}, P = 0.58 d; probable (80%) member of the Lower Centaurus–Crux subgroup of the Scorpius–Centaurus association. |
| HD 108054 | | | 108054 | 60601 | 12^{h} 25^{m} 17.62^{s} | −65° 46′ 10.6″ | 6.29 | 2.89 | 156 | G8/K0IV | |
| HD 105071 | | | 105071 | 59003 | 12^{h} 05^{m} 53.63^{s} | −65° 32′ 48.8″ | 6.30 | | | B8Ia-Iab | variable star, ΔV = 0.013^{m}, P = 1.45408 d |
| R Mus | | R | 110311 | 61981 | 12^{h} 42^{m} 05.03^{s} | −69° 24′ 27.2″ | 6.31 | −2.55 | 1929 | F7Ib | Cepheid variable, V_{max} = 5.93^{m}, V_{min} = 6.73^{m}, P = 7.510211 d |
| HD 113919 | | | 113919 | 64117 | 13^{h} 08^{m} 27.84^{s} | −67° 47′ 48.3″ | 6.34 | −1.09 | 1000 | M1III | |
| HD 107773 | | | 107773 | 60417 | 12^{h} 23^{m} 15.04^{s} | −67° 37′ 55.8″ | 6.36 | 2.83 | 166 | K0IV-V | |
| HD 117651 | | | 117651 | 66152 | 13^{h} 33^{m} 35.92^{s} | −65° 37′ 57.4″ | 6.36 | 1.21 | 349 | A0V | |
| HD 114912 | | | 114912 | 64682 | 13^{h} 15^{m} 25.77^{s} | −69° 40′ 45.1″ | 6.37 | 1.51 | 306 | K2/K3III | |
| HD 103482 | | | 103482 | 58085 | 11^{h} 54^{m} 44.62^{s} | −66° 22′ 33.7″ | 6.38 | 3.20 | 141 | F2IV | |
| HD 98695 | | | 98695 | 55350 | 11^{h} 20^{m} 04.16^{s} | −71° 59′ 39.6″ | 6.41 | −0.42 | 758 | B4V | |
| HD 104570 | | | 104570 | 58706 | 12^{h} 02^{m} 28.59^{s} | −71° 29′ 20.4″ | 6.41 | 0.86 | 421 | K1III | |
| HD 104752 | | | 104752 | 58810 | 12^{h} 03^{m} 44.54^{s} | −74° 12′ 50.7″ | 6.44 | −0.81 | 921 | G6III | |
| HD 98671 | | | 98671 | 55332 | 11^{h} 19^{m} 50.84^{s} | −72° 57′ 29.8″ | 6.46 | 0.59 | 486 | A0V | |
| HD 109857 | | | 109857 | 61738 | 12^{h} 39^{m} 14.64^{s} | −75° 22′ 14.1″ | 6.46 | −0.40 | 769 | B8Vn | |
| HD 101805 | (π^{2}) | | 101805 | 57092 | 11^{h} 42^{m} 14.82^{s} | −75° 13′ 38.3″ | 6.48 | 3.80 | 112 | G1V | |
| HD 105822 | | | 105822 | 59389 | 12^{h} 11^{m} 01.22^{s} | −68° 15′ 39.4″ | 6.48 | −0.82 | 939 | K0/K1III | |
| HD 118522 | κ | | 118522 | 66668 | 13^{h} 40^{m} 40^{s} | 70° 55′ 06″ | 6.59 | –0.86 | 309 | K0III | |
| ι^{2} Mus | ι^{2} | | 116579 | 65628 | 13^{h} 27^{m} 18.58^{s} | −74° 41′ 30.2″ | 6.62 | 0.71 | 495 | B9V | |
| HD 100546 | | KR | 100546 | 56379 | 11^{h} 33^{m} 25.44^{s} | −70° 11′ 41.2″ | 6.70 | | 337 | B9Vne | has an unconfirmed planet (b), Member of the Lower Centaurus–Crux subgroup of the Scorpius–Centaurus association. |
| HD 112410 | | | 112410 | 63242 | 12^{h} 57^{m} 32.0^{s} | −65° 38′ 47″ | 6.86 | | 440 | G8III | has a planet (b) |
| GQ Mus | | GQ | | | 11^{h} 52^{m} 02.35^{s} | −67° 12′ 20.2″ | 7.2 | | | | nova and AM Her variable |
| HD 105056 | | GS | 105056 | 58998 | 12^{h} 05^{m} 49.88^{s} | −69° 34′ 23.0″ | 7.34 | | 16000 | O9.5Ia | α Cyg variable, V_{max} = 7.34^{m}, V_{min} = 7.55^{m}, P = 3.85253 d |
| HD 111232 | | | 111232 | 62534 | 12^{h} 48^{m} 51.75^{s} | −68° 25′ 30.5″ | 7.61 | 5.31 | 94 | G8V | has a planet (b) |
| TU Mus | | TU | 100213 | 56196 | 11^{h} 31^{m} 10.92^{s} | −65° 44′ 32.1″ | 8.41 | | 15000 | O7.5V + O9.5V | β Lyr variable, V_{max} = 8.17^{m}, V_{min} = 8.75^{m}, P = 1.3872833 d |
| RT Mus | | RT | 310831 | 57260 | 11^{h} 44^{m} 32.88^{s} | −67° 18′ 18.9″ | 8.57 | | 3500 | F8 | Cepheid variable, V_{max} = 8.57^{m}, V_{min} = 9.32^{m}, P = 3.086131 d |
| T Mus | | T | 115673 | 65116 | 13^{h} 21^{m} 13.85^{s} | −74° 26′ 31.0″ | 8.60 | | 2040 | C+ | seimregular variable, V_{max} = 7.6^{m}, V_{min} = 8.6^{m}, P = 111.8 d |
| KZ Mus | | KZ | 109885 | 61751 | 12^{h} 39^{m} 19.16^{s} | −71° 37′ 18.5″ | 9.09 | | 11000 | B2III | β Cep variable |
| HD 108341 | | | 108341 | 60788 | 12^{h} 27^{m} 31.0^{s} | −71° 25′ 23″ | 9.36 | | 161 | K2V | has a planet (b) |
| UU Mus | | UU | 103137 | 57884 | 11^{h} 52^{m} 17.72^{s} | −65° 24′ 15.1″ | 9.54 | | 1490 | F8:p | Cepheid variable, V_{max} = 9.13^{m}, V_{min} = 10.28^{m}, P = 11.63641 d |
| SY Mus | | SY | 100336 | | 11^{h} 32^{m} 10.01^{s} | −65° 25′ 11.6″ | 10.20 | | 2770 | Mpe | Z Andromedae and semiregular variable, V_{max} = 10.2^{m}, V_{min} = 12.7^{m}, P = 624.5 d |
| MP Mus | | MP | | | 13^{h} 22^{m} 07.55^{s} | −69° 38′ 12.2″ | 10.39 | | | K1Ve | T Tauri star, ΔV = 0.127^{m}, P = 3.714 d |
| Y Mus | | Y | | 63911 | 13^{h} 05^{m} 48.20^{s} | −65° 30′ 46.6″ | 10.50 | | 698 | Fp | R CrB variable |
| TV Mus | | TV | 310730 | | 11^{h} 39^{m} 50.76^{s} | −64° 48′ 59.3″ | 10.75 | | 755 | F2 | W UMa variable |
| LP 145-141 | | | | 57367 | 11^{h} 45^{m} 42.92^{s} | −64° 50′ 29.5″ | 11.51 | | 15.106 | DQ6 | 4th-closest white dwarf |
| GRS 1124-683 | | GU | | | 11^{h} 26^{m} 26.60^{s} | −68° 40′ 32.3″ | 13.3 | | | K3V-K7V | X-ray nova |
| 2S 1254-690 | | GR | | | 12^{h} 57^{m} 30.15^{s} | −69° 17′ 19.0″ | 19.1 | | | | Low-mass X-ray binary, V_{max} = 18^{m}, V_{min} = 19.1^{m}, P = 0.1636 d |
| PSR J1141-6545 | | | | | 11^{h} 41^{m} 07.02^{s} | −65° 45′ 19.1″ | 25.08 | | | | pulsar/white dwarf binary |
| KN Mus | | KN | 117622 | | 13^{h} 33^{m} 32.86^{s} | −65° 58′ 27.1″ | | | 1780 | WC2/WO1 | central star of planetary nebula NGC 5189 |
Table legend: • Name = Proper name • B = Bayer designation • F or/and G. = Flamsteed designation or Gould designation • Var = Variable star designation • HD = Henry Draper Catalogue designation number • HIP = Hipparcos Catalogue designation number • RA = Right ascension for the Epoch/Equinox J2000.0 • Dec = Declination for the Epoch/Equinox J2000.0 • vis. mag. = visual magnitude (m or m_{v}), also known as apparent magnitude • abs. mag. = absolute magnitude (M_{v}) • Dist. (ly) = Distance in light-years from Earth • Sp. class = Spectral class of the star in the stellar classification system • Notes = Common name(s) or alternate name(s); comments; notable properties [for example: multiple star status, range of variability if it is a variable star, exoplanets, etc.]

== See also ==
- List of stars by constellation
