= HD 24733 =

Binary star in the constellation Camelopardalis

- Location of HD 24733 (circled)

Observation data Epoch J2000 Equinox ICRS
- Constellation: Camelopardalis
- Right ascension: 03^{h} 58^{m} 38.20939^{s}
- Declination: +53° 59′ 19.2990″
- Apparent magnitude (V): 7.038

Characteristics
- Spectral type: A3V + G0V
- B−V color index: +0.22
- J−H color index: +0.052
- J−K color index: +0.090
- Variable type: Beta Lyrae variable

Astrometry
Radial velocity (R_{v})	5.89 ± 9.72 km/s
Proper motion (μ)	RA: 8.560 mas/yr Dec.: -17.247 mas/yr
Parallax (π)	5.3806±0.0227 mas
Distance	606 ± 3 ly (185.9 ± 0.8 pc)

Orbit
Primary	HD 24733 A
Name	HD 24733 B
Period (P)	1.762838 d
Eccentricity (e)	0.084±0.015
Inclination (i)	67°
Periastron epoch (T)	2440489.71±0.04
Argument of periastron (ω) (secondary)	94±8°

Details

HD 24733 A
Mass	1.60 M_{☉}
Luminosity	24.0 L_{☉}
Temperature	7160 K

Other designations
- DD Cam, AG+53° 347, BD+53° 718, GC 4764, HD 24733, HIP 18585, SAO 24324, PPM 28814, TIC 72528673, TYC 3717-534-1, GSC 03717-00534, 2MASS J03583820+5359193, Gaia DR3 252190725755396864

Database references
SIMBAD	data

HD 24733 is a spectroscopic binary system that is also a Beta Lyrae variable located about 606 light-years (186 parsecs) away in the deep northern constellation of Camelopardalis, close to the border with Perseus. It has the variable-star designation DD Camelopardalis (sometimes abbreviated to DD Cam). With a mean apparent magnitude of 7.038, it is too faint to be seen by the naked eye from Earth, but readily visible through binoculars.

== Description ==
The primary star of the system is an A-type main-sequence star with a spectral type of A3V. It has a mass of 2.16 M_{☉} and, at an effective temperature of 7,160 K (6,890 °C; 12,430 °F), radiates 24 times the luminosity of the Sun from its photosphere. The star displays no chemical peculiarity. The secondary star is thought to be a G-type main-sequence star with the spectral type G0V.

HD 24733 was discovered to be a variable star by László Szabados, who observed the star at the Piszkéstető Station of Konkoly Observatory from late 1991 until early 1995. It was independently discovered to be variable from the Hipparcos satellite data, and was given its variable star designation in 1999. The two stars revolve around each other in a tight, nearly circular (eccentricity 0.084) orbit with a period of 1.762838 days (1 day, 18 hours, 18 minutes). As seen from Earth, one component periodically passes in front of the other, blocking some or all of its light. Hence, the star system appears to vary in brightness; from a maximum apparent magnitude of 6.97, it dips by 0.17 and 0.11 mag as each of the stars is obscured by its companion.

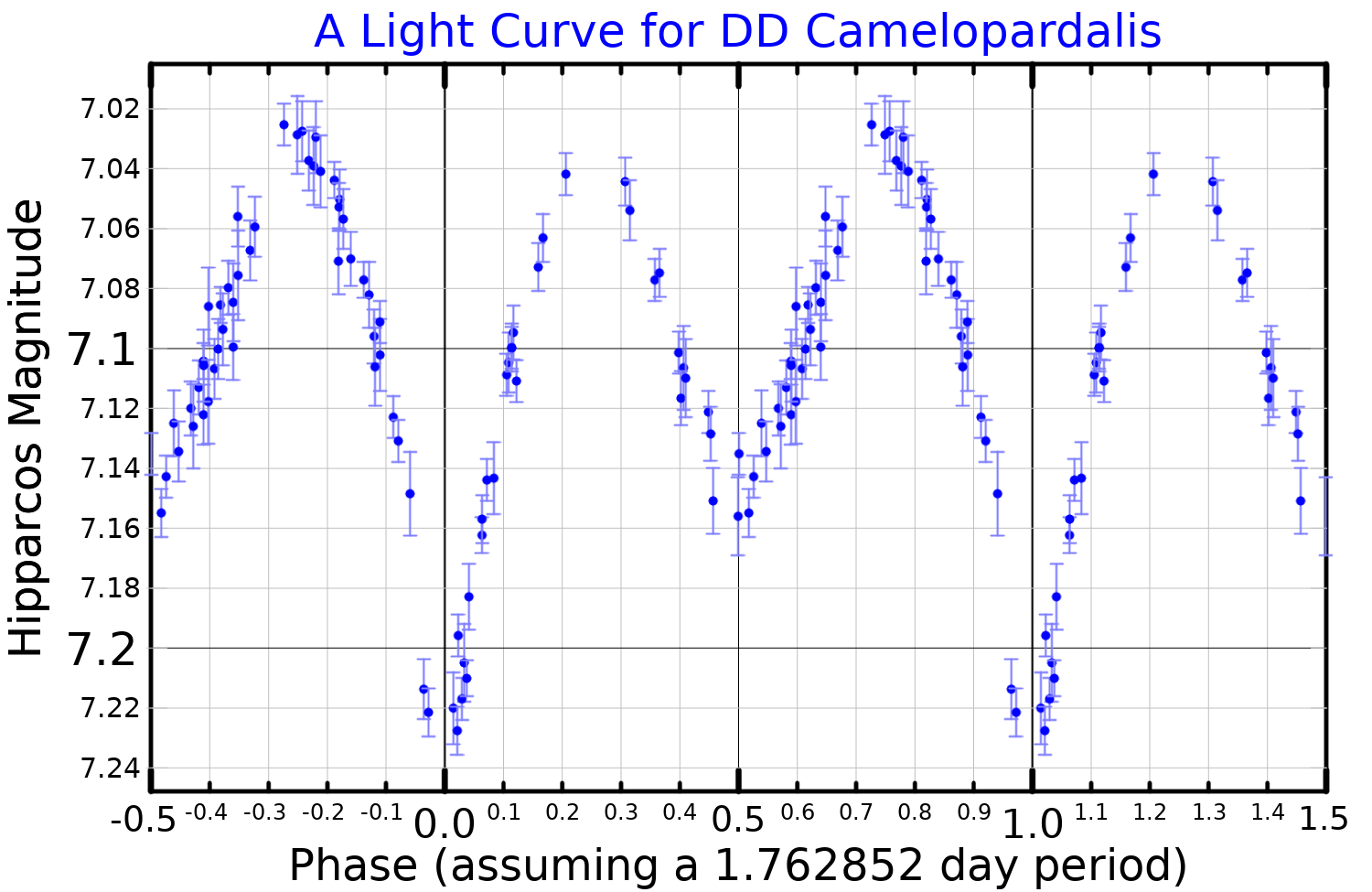
A light curve for DD Camelopardalis, plotted from Hipparcos data

The shape of the light curves imply that, because of their close proximity to one another, the two stars are both heavily distorted to an ellipsoidal shape due to mutual gravitational interactions. Additionally, the system may be surrounded by circumstellar material.

== See also ==
- DV Aquarii
- HD 40372
