= Iota Muscae =

The Bayer designation ι Muscae (Iota Muscae) is shared by two stars in the constellation Musca:

- ι^{1} Muscae
- ι^{2} Muscae
