= CN Andromedae =

Star in the constellation Andromeda

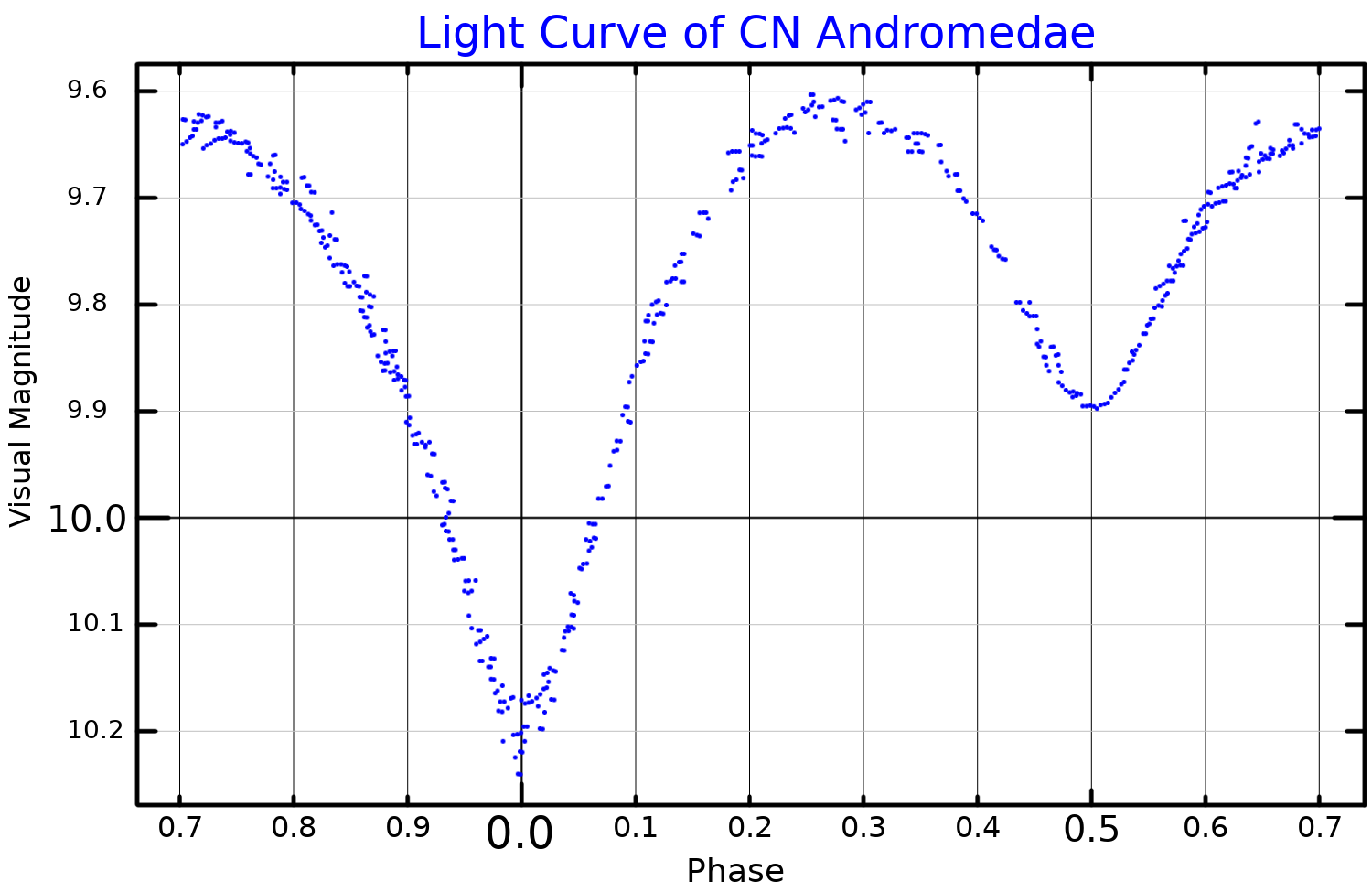
- The visual band light curve of CN Andromedae, adapted from a plot presented by Varol Keskin

Observation data Epoch J2000 Equinox ICRS
- Constellation: Andromeda
- Right ascension: 00^{h} 20^{m} 30.54209^{s}
- Declination: +40° 13′ 33.80342″
- Apparent magnitude (V): 9.62 – 10.21 variable

Characteristics
- Spectral type: F5V
- Apparent magnitude (B): 10.24
- Apparent magnitude (V): 9.706
- Apparent magnitude (G): 9.6637
- Apparent magnitude (J): 8.670
- Apparent magnitude (H): 8.452
- Apparent magnitude (K): 8.427
- B−V color index: 0.49725
- Variable type: EB

Astrometry
Radial velocity (R_{v})	−24.2±1.0 km/s
Proper motion (μ)	RA: −8.549±0.054 mas/yr Dec.: −35.291±0.024 mas/yr
Parallax (π)	4.9670±0.0425 mas
Distance	657 ± 6 ly (201 ± 2 pc)

Orbit
Period (P)	0.4627952±0.000035 days
Semi-major axis (a)	3.066±0.035
Inclination (i)	68.51±0.17°
Periastron epoch (T)	HJD 2445231.51710±0.00059

Details

Primary
Mass	1.433±0.030 M_{☉}
Radius	1.48±0.03 R_{☉}
Luminosity	3.40 L_{☉}
Surface gravity (log g)	4.24 cgs
Temperature	6,450 K

Secondary
Mass	0.552±0.020 M_{☉}
Radius	0.95 R_{☉}
Luminosity	0.40 L_{☉}
Surface gravity (log g)	4.22 cgs
Temperature	4,726 K

Other designations
- 2MASS J00203054+4013337, BD+39 59, TYC 2787-1815-1

Database references
SIMBAD	data

CN Andromedae (CN And) is an eclipsing binary star in the constellation Andromeda. Its maximum apparent visual magnitude is 9.62 and drops down to a minimum of 10.2 during the main eclipse. It is classified as a Beta Lyrae variable with a period roughly of 0.4628 days.

== System ==
The two stars in this system orbit very close to each other; their spectrum cannot be separated and as a whole they have a spectrum of an F5V star. They are in marginal contact, and there is a mass flow from the primary star to the secondary at a rate of 1.4 × 10^{−7} M_{☉} yr^{−1}. The binary orbit is slowly decaying at rate 1.5*10^{−7} days/year. The third suspected component of the system is the red dwarf star with mass about 0.11 M_{☉}, at 38±4 years orbit around binary.

== Variability ==
Confirmation of the variability of CN Andromedae was announced by R. Weber in 1956. The light curve of the star shows a primary eclipse, with its brightness dropping down to 10.21 magnitude, and a secondary one down to a magnitude of 9.9. This phenomenon repeats with a cycle of approximately 11.1 hours, with period decreasing in time due to the mass transfer from one star to the other.
