= AD Andromedae =

Eclipsing binary star in the constellation Andromeda

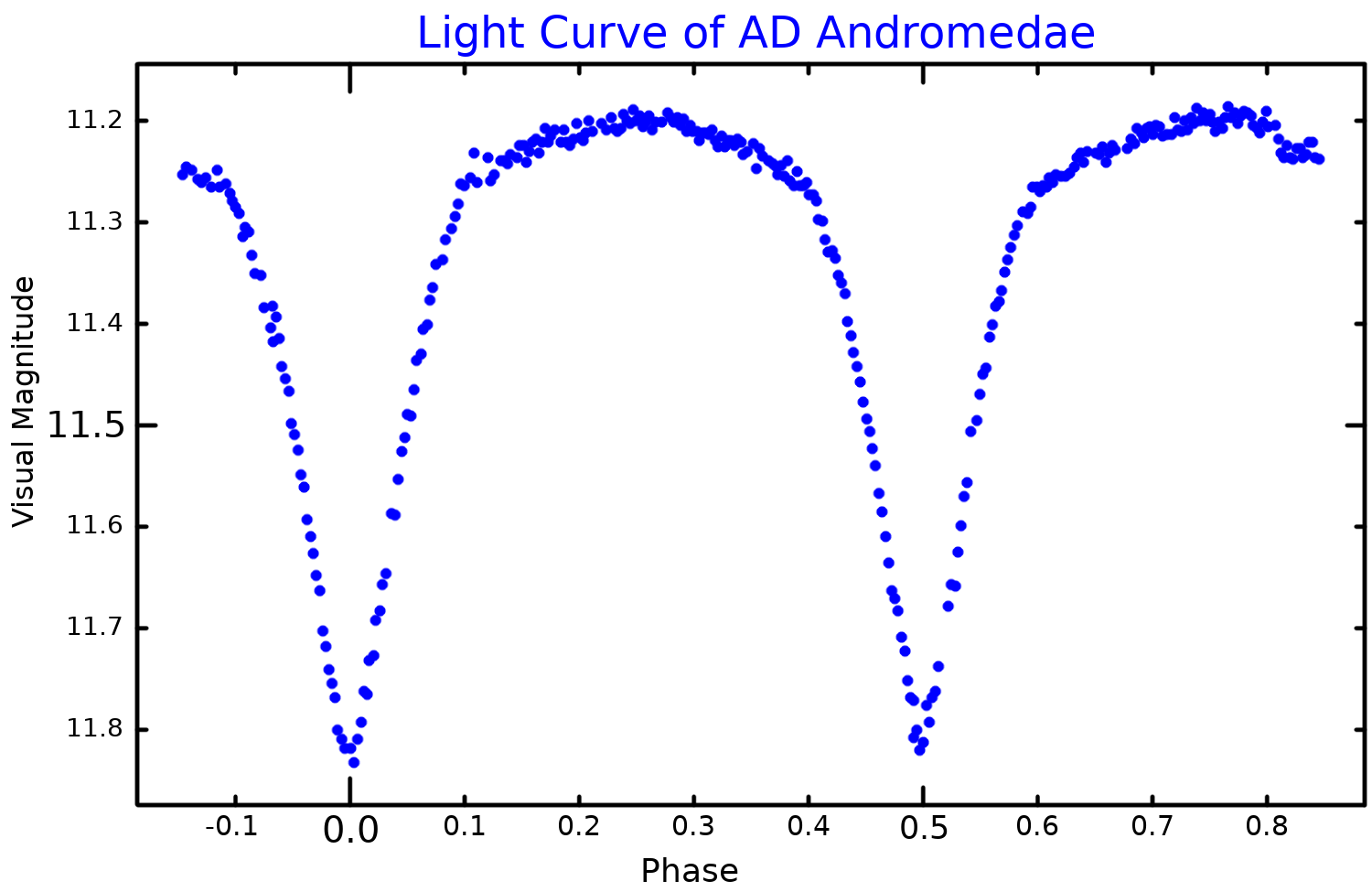
- A visual band light curve of AD Andromedae, from Liakos et al.

Observation data Epoch J2000 Equinox ICRS
- Constellation: Andromeda
- Right ascension: 23^{h} 36^{m} 45.00656^{s}
- Declination: +48° 40′ 15.5746″
- Apparent magnitude (V): 11.2 – 11.82 variable

Characteristics
- Evolutionary stage: main sequence
- Spectral type: A0V
- Apparent magnitude (B): 11.2
- Apparent magnitude (V): 11.0
- Apparent magnitude (G): 11.0304
- Apparent magnitude (J): 10.897
- Apparent magnitude (H): 10.819
- Apparent magnitude (K): 10.769
- B−V color index: 0.80
- Variable type: β Lyrae

Astrometry
Proper motion (μ)	RA: −4.614±0.022 mas/yr Dec.: −3.809±0.022 mas/yr
Parallax (π)	0.9280±0.0260 mas
Distance	3,510 ± 100 ly (1,080 ± 30 pc)

Orbit
Period (P)	0.986 days
Semi-major axis (a)	7.5 R_{☉}
Inclination (i)	82.6°
Periastron epoch (T)	HJD 2,439,002.458

Details

Primary
Mass	2.76 M_{☉}
Radius	2.3 R_{☉}
Luminosity	44 L_{☉}
Temperature	9,800 K

Secondary
Mass	2.7 M_{☉}
Radius	2.4 R_{☉}
Luminosity	47 L_{☉}
Temperature	9,720 K

Other designations
- 2MASS J23364500+4840155, BD+47 4207, TYC 3641-151-1, GSC 03641-00151

Database references
SIMBAD	data

AD Andromedae (AD And) is an eclipsing binary in the constellation Andromeda. Its maximum apparent visual magnitude is 11.2, but it shows a decrease of 0.62 magnitudes during the main eclipse and 0.58 during the secondary one. It is classified as a Beta Lyrae variable star with a period of almost one day.

== System ==
The AD Andromedae system consists of two close main sequence stars of spectral type A0V. They orbit so close to each other that they have an ellipsoidal shape induced by their gravitational interaction.

The presence in this system of a third body with a minimum mass of 2.21 M_{☉} has been proposed; however, it should give a significant contribution to the light emitted by the system, and has not been detected yet. A possible solution is for two unseen, but less massive and luminous, stars orbiting close to each other.

== Variability ==
The orbital plane of the two stars is aligned to our line of sight, so each component eclipses the other when passing in front of it. In AD Andromedae this cycle repeats with a period 20 minutes less than one day.

A cyclic variation of 14.3 years in the orbital period of this binary system has been reported, and this could be an effect of another body orbiting in this system.

AD Andromedae received its variable star designation in 1927.
