= SV Centauri =

Star in the constellation Centaurus

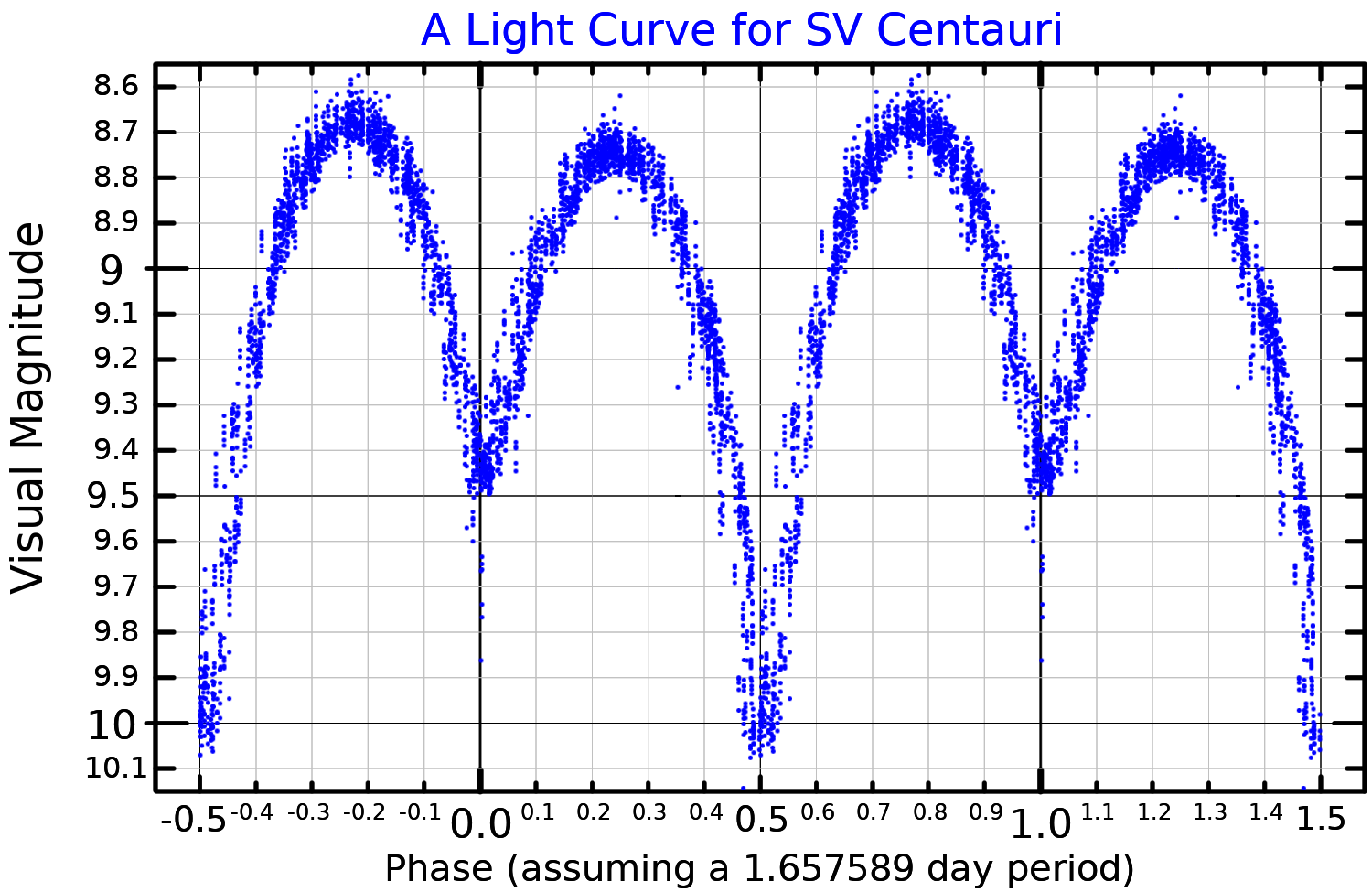
- A blue band light curve for SV Centauri, plotted from ASAS data

Observation data Epoch J2000 Equinox ICRS
- Constellation: Centaurus
- Right ascension: 11^{h} 47^{m} 57.2195^{s}
- Declination: −60° 33′ 57.757″
- Apparent magnitude (V): 8.71 to 9.98

Characteristics
- Spectral type: B1V + B6.5III
- U−B color index: −0.74
- B−V color index: 0.06
- Variable type: Eclipsing binary (β Lyrae)

Astrometry
Radial velocity (R_{v})	−27.7 ± 6.3 km/s
Proper motion (μ)	RA: −6.109 mas/yr Dec.: 0.291 mas/yr
Parallax (π)	0.4876±0.0352 mas
Distance	6,700 ± 500 ly (2,100 ± 100 pc)

Details

Primary
Mass	7.7 M_{☉}
Radius	6.8 R_{☉}
Luminosity	11,700 L_{☉}
Temperature	23,000 K

Secondary
Mass	9.6 M_{☉}
Radius	7.4 R_{☉}
Luminosity	1900 L_{☉}
Temperature	14,000 K

Other designations
- SV Centauri, CD−59 3950, HD 102552

Database references
SIMBAD	data

SV Centauri is a variable star in the constellation Centaurus. An eclipsing binary, its visual apparent magnitude has a maximum of 8.71, fading to 9.98 during primary eclipse and 9.42 during secondary eclipse. From its brightness, it's estimated to be around 6,000 light-years (1,800 parsecs) away from Earth. Parallax measurements from Gaia Data Release 2 yield a similar distance of around 2,100 pc. Henrietta Leavitt announced the discovery of this variable star, in 1906, when it was called CPD-59° 3809. It was given its variable star designation, SV Centauri, in 1907.

SV Centauri is a contact binary made of two hot B-type stars with spectral types of B1V and B6.5III and effective temperatures of 23,000 and 14,000 K. The primary component, the brighter star with 11,700 times the solar luminosity, is the less massive one with 7.7 times the solar mass and has a radius of 6.8 times the solar radius. The secondary component has a mass equal to 9.6 solar masses, radius of 7.4 solar radii and a brightness 1,900 times larger than the Sun's. The separation between the center of each star is only 15.3 solar radii. The system is viewed from a high inclination of 81.8°.

The orbital period of SV Centauri is monotonically decreasing at a very fast mean rate of 2.1 seconds per year, the largest rate for any known system. The first observations of the system, in 1894, revealed a period of 1.6606 days, which decreased to 1.6581 days in 1993, showing a decrease rate that is variable with time, but with time intervals of 10 to 30 years when it is constant. The transition between such intervals of constant change can be accompanied by very fast decreases in the period, such as of 15 seconds per year in 1975.

The most probable explanation for the period decrease is mass transfer from the less massive to the more massive star and subsequent mass loss through the L_{3} Lagrangian point of the system, which is located on the outer side of the more massive star. The mass loss causes loss of angular momentum, which is compensated by a decrease in the separation between the stars. In this model, the system is losing mass at a rate of about 5 ×10^{−5} solar masses per year; the variation of this rate causes the variation in the rate of period decrease. The alternative possibility is mass transfer from the more massive to the less massive star, which naturally tends to decrease the orbital period. This may create an accretion disk around the less massive star, similar to Beta Lyrae.
