= BX Andromedae =

Star in the constellation Andromeda

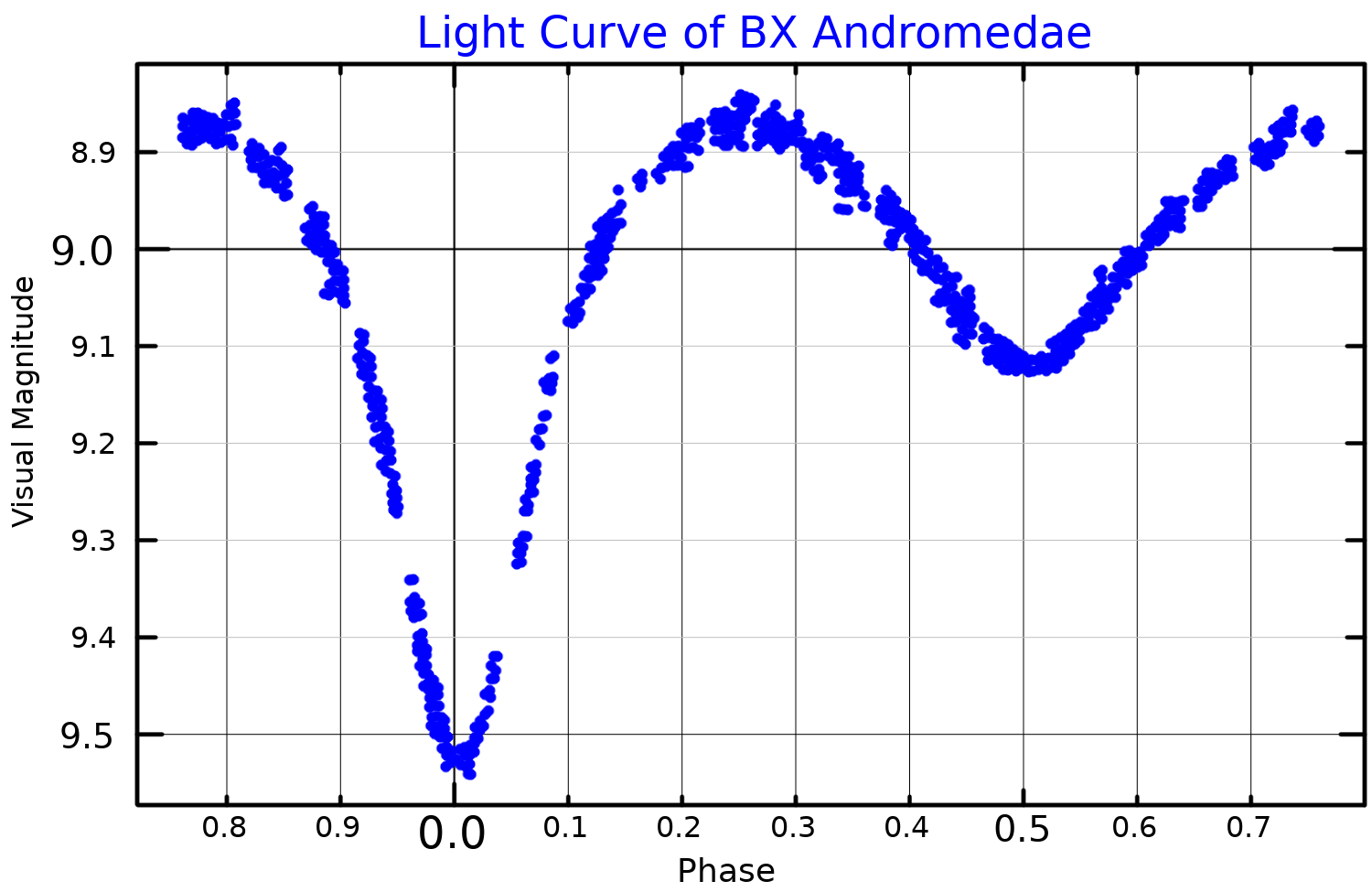
- The visual band light curve of BX Andromedae, adapted from Samec et al.

Observation data Epoch J2000 Equinox J2000
- Constellation: Andromeda
- Right ascension: 02^{h} 09^{m} 03.4213^{s}
- Declination: +40° 47′ 39.167″
- Apparent magnitude (V): 8.87 – 9.53 variable

Characteristics
- Evolutionary stage: main sequence
- Spectral type: F2V
- Apparent magnitude (B): 9.37
- Apparent magnitude (V): 8.98
- Apparent magnitude (G): 8.873359
- Apparent magnitude (J): 8.487
- Apparent magnitude (H): 8.229
- Apparent magnitude (K): 8.134
- B−V color index: 0.3927
- Variable type: EB

Astrometry
Radial velocity (R_{v})	−45.10±2.6 km/s
Proper motion (μ)	RA: 9.846(23) mas/yr Dec.: −8.425(24) mas/yr
Parallax (π)	5.5643±0.0216 mas
Distance	586 ± 2 ly (179.7 ± 0.7 pc)

Orbit
Period (P)	0.61011240 days
Semi-major axis (a)	4.424 R_{☉}
Inclination (i)	75.862°
Semi-amplitude (K_{1}) (primary)	106.35±0.61 km/s
Semi-amplitude (K_{2}) (secondary)	233.58±1.77 km/s

Details

Primary
Mass	2.148 M_{☉}
Radius	2.01 R_{☉}
Luminosity	7.08 L_{☉}
Temperature	6,650 K

Secondary
Mass	0.977 M_{☉}
Radius	1.40 R_{☉}
Luminosity	0.90 L_{☉}
Temperature	4,758 K

Other designations
- 2MASS J02090342+4047392, BD+40 442, HD 13078, HIP 10027, SAO 37805, TYC 2833-1436-1

Database references
SIMBAD	data

BX Andromedae (BX And) is an eclipsing binary star in the constellation Andromeda. Its maximum apparent visual magnitude is 8.87. Within a cycle of approximately 14.6 hours, the brightness drops down to a magnitude of 9.53 during the main eclipse, and to a magnitude of 9.12 during the secondary one. It is classified as a Beta Lyrae variable.

== Variability ==
The variability of BX Andromedae was reported first by A. Soloviev, in 1945. He believed it to be an eclipsing binary, but was unable to deduce its period. The star's period was first measured in 1951, by Joseph Ashbrook.

BX Andromedae, like all Beta Lyrae variables, shows a primary and a secondary minimum when, respectively, the most luminous and the less luminous component of the pair is eclipsed by the other. The brightness however changes smoothly, so there is no onset and an end time for the eclipses. This cycle repeats approximately every 14.6 hours.

== System ==
The two stars in the system are orbiting so close to each other that they retain an ellipsoidal shape. The spectrum of the two stars has not been separated yet; as a whole, the system has a spectral type F2V. The physical parameters of the stars (like mass, radius, and temperature) can be inferred from the light curve.

BX Andromedae, however, may be a quadruple system. This system shows slight orbital period variations that could be induced by a third faint body in the system with an orbital period of 62 years. There is also a visual companion star TYC 2833-53-1 of 10.85 magnitude only 20 arcseconds away with a common proper motion and a distance (measured with parallax) compatible with the one of BX Andromedae, and has an estimated mass of 1.04 M_{☉}.
