= WZ Andromedae =

Eclipsing binary star in the constellation Andromeda

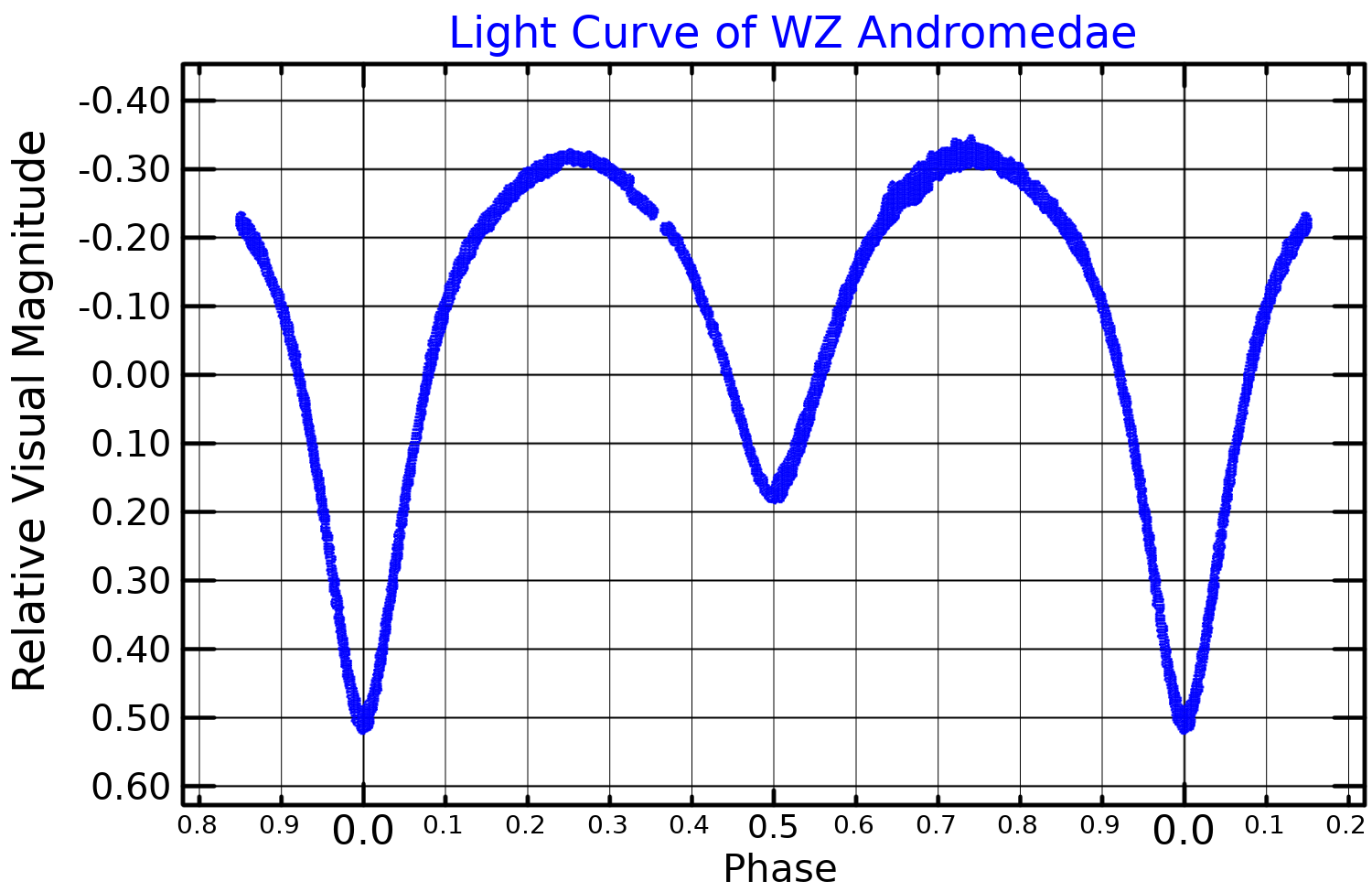
- The visual band light curve of WZ Andromedae, adapted from Zhang & Zhang (2006)

Observation data Epoch J2000 Equinox J2000
- Constellation: Andromeda
- Right ascension: 01^{h} 01^{m} 43.64669^{s}
- Declination: +38° 05′ 46.4912″
- Apparent magnitude (V): 11.6 – 12.0 variable

Characteristics
- Spectral type: F5 + G3
- Apparent magnitude (B): 11.87
- Apparent magnitude (V): 11.26
- Apparent magnitude (G): 11.255
- Apparent magnitude (J): 10.252
- Apparent magnitude (H): 9.930
- Apparent magnitude (K): 9.896
- B−V color index: 0.5729
- Variable type: EB

Astrometry
Proper motion (μ)	RA: 14.218±0.017 mas/yr Dec.: −0.833±0.014 mas/yr
Parallax (π)	1.9333±0.0220 mas
Distance	1,690 ± 20 ly (517 ± 6 pc)

Orbit
Period (P)	0.6956612±0.0000001 yr
Periastron epoch (T)	2446025.734±0.002

Details
Mass	2.27 (Note: Total mass of the two main components) M_{☉}

Other designations
- 2MASS J01014364+3805464, TYC 2799-1250-1

Database references
SIMBAD	data

WZ Andromedae (abbreviated to WZ And) is an eclipsing binary star in the constellation Andromeda. Its maximum apparent visual magnitude is 11.6, but drops down to 12.00 during the main eclipse which occurs roughly every 16.7 hours.

== Variability ==
This binary star was found to be variable by Henrietta Leavitt, and shows the usual two eclipses, a main one and a secondary one with a less pronounced drop in magnitude. The period of 16.7 days, however, was found to vary in time without any consolidated trend.

== System ==
In an eclipsing binary system, the 16.7 day period is also the orbital period. The two stars are of spectral type F5 and G3, and they have almost the same mass. They could be so close that mass transfer is occurring in the system, changing the orbital period in time. An alternative explanation could be the presence in the system of two low mass companions with orbital periods of 50 and 70 years, respectively. Their contribution to the luminosity of the system, however, would be negligible (less than 1%), but they would have a large angular separation (45 and 72 mas) from the two main stars.
