= Iota Lyrae =

Binary star in the constellation Lyra

- Location of ι Lyrae (circled in red)

Observation data Epoch J2000.0 Equinox ICRS
- Constellation: Lyra
- Right ascension: 19^{h} 07^{m} 18.13251^{s}
- Declination: +36° 06′ 00.5592″
- Apparent magnitude (V): 5.22

Characteristics
- Spectral type: B6IV
- Variable type: Be star

Astrometry
Radial velocity (R_{v})	−26.0±4.6 km/s
Proper motion (μ)	RA: −1.437 mas/yr Dec.: −3.876 mas/yr
Parallax (π)	3.5858±0.1924 mas
Distance	910 ± 50 ly (280 ± 10 pc)
Absolute magnitude (M_{V})	−1.94

Orbit
Period (P)	216.93 yr
Semi-major axis (a)	0.172″
Eccentricity (e)	0.637
Inclination (i)	145.5°
Longitude of the node (Ω)	171.4°
Periastron epoch (T)	B 1997.28
Argument of periastron (ω) (secondary)	201.2°

Details
Mass	5.2 M_{☉}
Radius	6.7 R_{☉}
Luminosity	854 L_{☉}
Surface gravity (log g)	3.54 cgs
Temperature	12,059 K
Metallicity [Fe/H]	−0.11 dex
Rotational velocity (v sin i)	224 km/s
Age	168 Myr

Other designations
- ι Lyr, 18 Lyr, BD+35°3485, GC 26338, HD 178475, HIP 93903, HR 7262, SAO 67834, WDS 19073+3606, GSC 02652-01709

Database references
SIMBAD	data

ι Lyrae, Latinised as Iota Lyrae, is a binary star in the northern constellation of Lyra. It is visible to the naked eye as a dim, blue-white hued star with an apparent visual magnitude that fluctuates around 5.22. This object is located approximately 910 light years distant from the Sun based on parallax, but is drifting nearer with a radial velocity of −26 km/s.

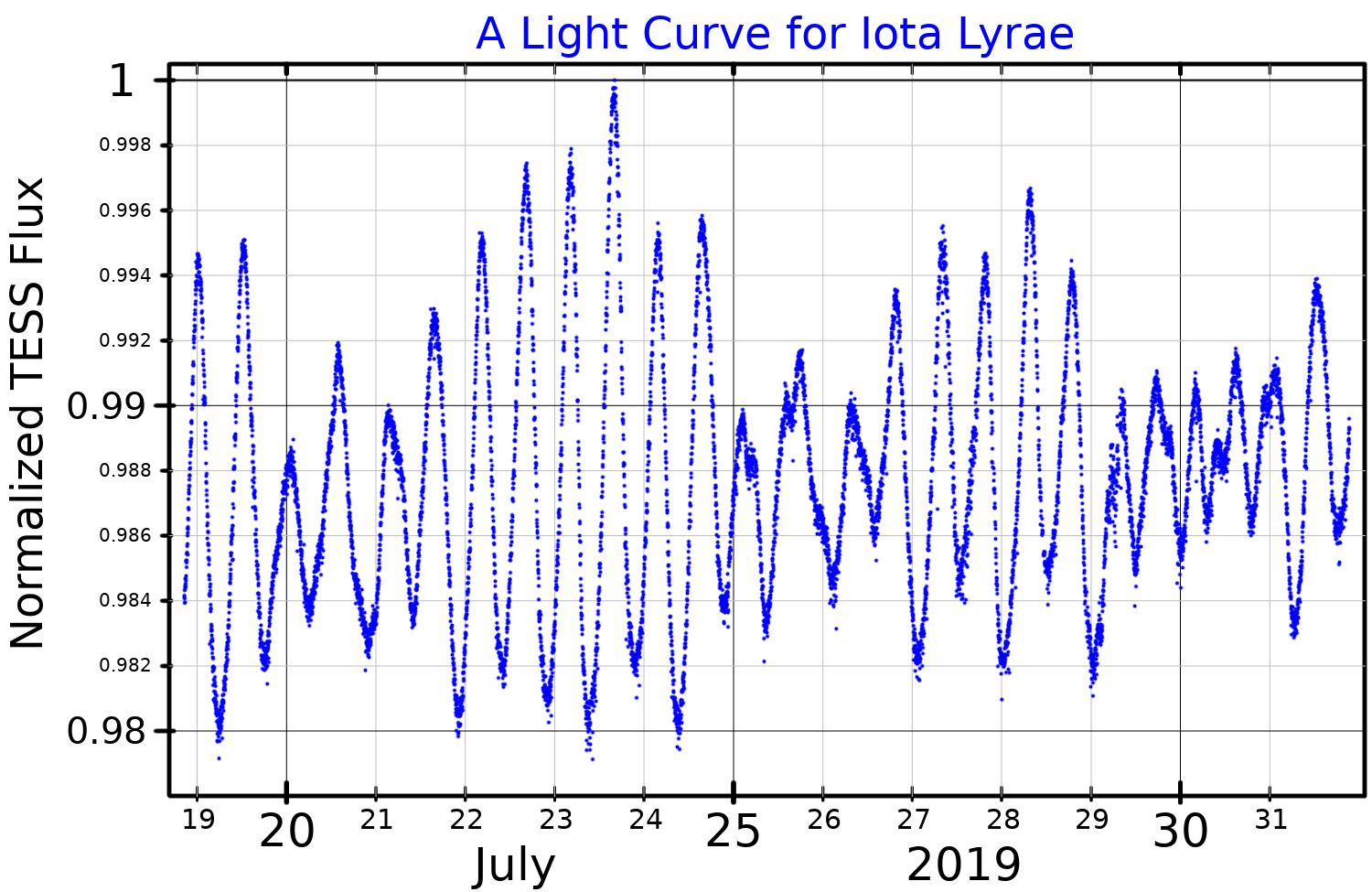
A light curve for Iota Lyrae, plotted from TESS data

This is a wide binary system with a computed orbital period of 217 years and an eccentricity of 0.6. The primary component has a stellar classification of B6IV, matching a B-type subgiant star. It is a Be star, displaying emission lines in its spectrum, and is spinning rapidly with a projected rotational velocity of 224 km/s. The star ranges in brightness from magnitude 5.20 down to 5.27. It has about five times the mass of the Sun and is radiating 854 times the Sun's luminosity from its photosphere at an effective temperature of 12,059 K.
