= V Puppis =

Variable star in the constellation Puppis

- Location of V Puppis (circled)

Observation data Epoch J2000 Equinox ICRS
- Constellation: Puppis
- A
- Right ascension: 07^{h} 58^{m} 14.43920^{s}
- Declination: −49° 14′ 41.6803″
- Apparent magnitude (V): 4.41 (5.10 + 5.59)

Characteristics

A
- Evolutionary stage: main sequence
- Spectral type: B1Vp + B3IV: + B + B
- U−B color index: −0.96
- B−V color index: −0.17
- Variable type: β Lyr

Astrometry

A
Radial velocity (R_{v})	+20.0±1.1 km/s
Proper motion (μ)	RA: −5.53±0.26 mas/yr Dec.: +8.27±0.25 mas/yr
Parallax (π)	2.40±0.23 mas
Distance	1,400 ± 100 ly (420 ± 40 pc)
Absolute magnitude (M_{V})	−3.56

Orbit
Primary	primary
Name	secondary
Period (P)	1.4544859 d
Semi-major axis (a)	14.96±0.20 R_{☉}
Eccentricity (e)	0
Inclination (i)	80.5±0.3°
Semi-amplitude (K_{1}) (primary)	175.4±3.2 km/s
Semi-amplitude (K_{2}) (secondary)	338.8±5.4 km/s

Orbit
Name	tertiary
Period (P)	5,200.4±5.0 days
Semi-major axis (a)	≥17.74±0.81 au
Eccentricity (e)	0.31±0.02
Longitude of the node (Ω)	200.6±4.7°
Periastron epoch (T)	2,461,365.03±68.83 HJD

Orbit
Name	quaternary
Period (P)	15,100±100 days
Semi-major axis (a)	≥35±7 au
Eccentricity (e)	0.6±0.1
Longitude of the node (Ω)	232.1±6.4°
Periastron epoch (T)	2,468,204.31±287.40 HJD

Details

primary (Aa)
Mass	14.0±0.5 M_{☉}
Radius	5.48±0.18 R_{☉}
Luminosity	12,600±2,100 L_{☉}
Temperature	26,000±1,000 K
Rotational velocity (v sin i)	246±5 km/s
Age	5.0±0.8 Myr

secondary (Ab)
Mass	7.3±0.3 M_{☉}
Radius	4.59±0.15 R_{☉}
Luminosity	6,500+1,300 −1,100 L_{☉}
Temperature	24,000±1,000 K
Rotational velocity (v sin i)	209±6 km/s
Age	5.0±0.8 Myr

tertiary
Mass	≥6.28±0.22 M_{☉}

quaternary
Mass	≥3.52±0.54 M_{☉}

Other designations
- CD−48°3349, CCDM J07582-4915A, GC 10802, GSC 08143−03239, HIP 38957, HR 3129, HD 65818, SAO 219226, WDS J07582-4915A

Database references
SIMBAD	data

V Puppis (V Pup) is a quadruple star system in the constellation Puppis. It has an apparent magnitude of 4.41, which is bright enough to be seen with the naked eye. Based on parallax measurements, it lies at a distance of 420 parsecs (1,400 light-years).

== Characteristics ==
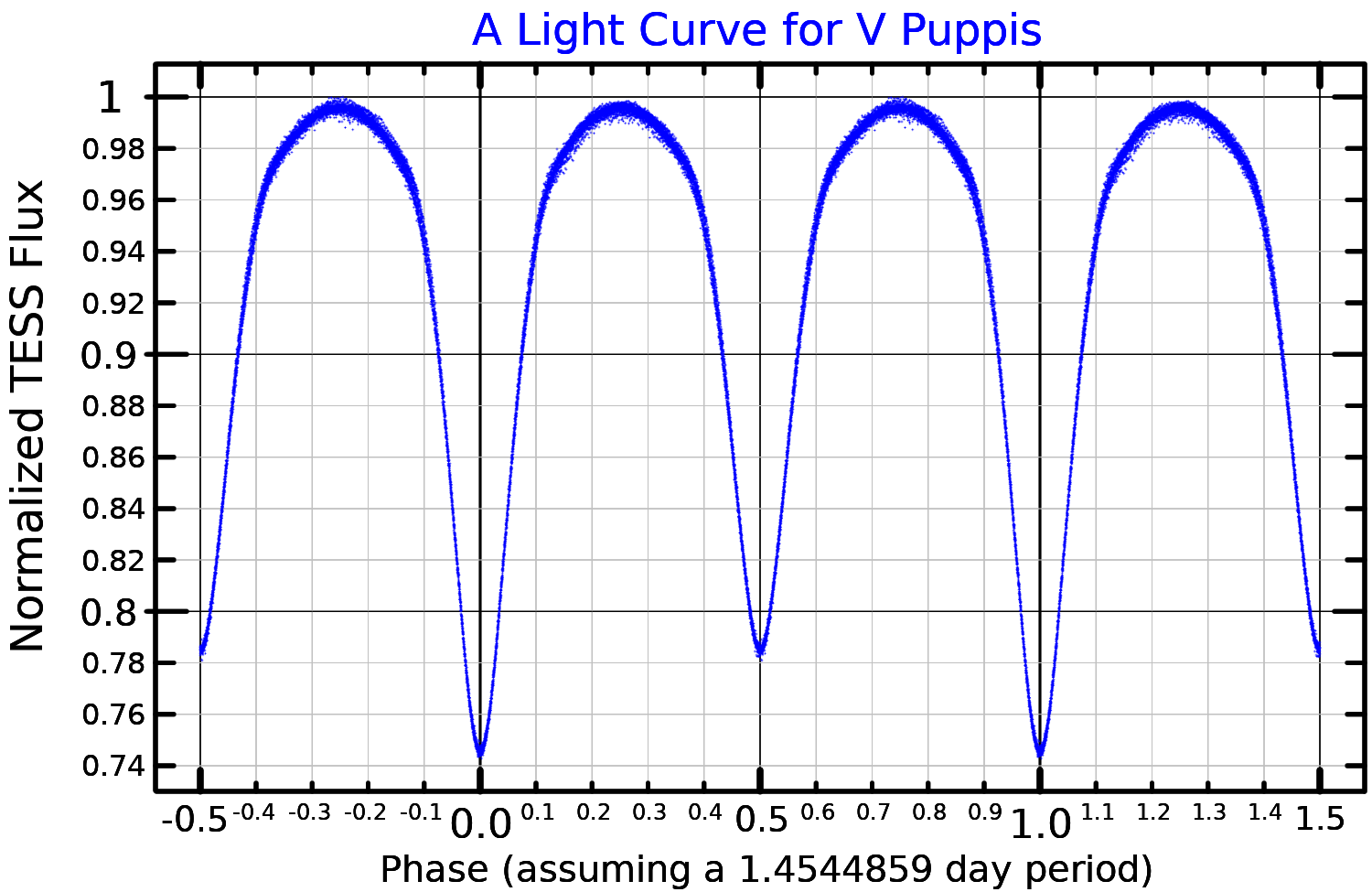
A light curve for V Puppis, plotted from TESS data

V Puppis is an eclipsing binary with two spectroscopic components orbiting with a period of only 1.4544859 days. The two stars are separated by 15 solar radii (0.070 au; 10,000,000 km), being on a semi-detached configuration. Both stars are B-type main-sequence stars. The primary, mass-gaining, star is of spectral type B1Vp, and has 14 times the mass of the Sun and 5.5 times the Sun's radius. It radiates 12,600 times the solar luminosity from its photosphere at an effective temperature of 26,000 K. The secondary, mass-lossing star is of spectral type B3IV:, has 7.3 times the Sun's mass and 4.6 times the radius. It radiates 6,500 times the Sun's luminosity from its photosphere at an effective temperature of 24,000 K.

While the primary's properties are consistent with a main sequence evolution, the secondary appears overluminous compared to a main sequence star of same mass. It is thought that the secondary was formerly the most massive component but underwent mass transfer with the former secondary, with most of the mass being ejected into space rather than being accreted to the former secondary.

It has been suggested that there are two additional stars members of the V Puppis A system, both massive B-type main-sequence stars. These two stars have orbital periods of 5,200 days (14 years) and 15,100 days (41 years), respectively, about the inner pair. The inner star has a mass of at least 6.3 solar masses and a semi-major axis of at least 17.7 au, while the outer star has a mass of at least 3.5 times solar and a semi-major axis of at least 35 au. Their semi-major axis approximately follow a 1:2 ratio and their orbital periods approximately follow a ratio of 1:3, suggesting that the all the stars formed via the fragmentation of a protoplanetary disk.

This system makes part of the multiple star system WDS J07582-4915, which consists on the visual components:

- WDS J07582-4915 A, V Puppis
- B, a magnitude 11.5 star separated 6.2" from A;
- C, at magnitude 13.2 and separation 18.9";
- D, at magnitude 9.88 and separation 39";
- E, at magnitude 13 and separation from D of 10.4".

At least D appears to be a physical companion to V Puppis. It is 403 ± 2 parsecs (1,314.4 ± 6.5 light-years) away based on its Gaia DR3 parallax and is a 96% probability member of the OCSN 199 cluster. Component B is 406.9 ± 3.5 parsecs (1,327 ± 11 light-years) away and is a member of the OCSN 200 cluster with 96% probability. Component C is 324 ± 15 parsecs (1,057 ± 49 light-years) away and shares a common proper motion with V Puppis, while component E is a background object unrelated to all other companions, 2,460 ± 60 parsecs (8,020 ± 200 light-years) away.

== Supposed black hole companion ==
V Puppis had been suspected to contain a black hole companion, based on the difference between the observed eclipse times and the predicted times, which would be caused by the light travel time effect of an orbiting companion.

The third body was initially calculated in 2008 to have an orbital period of 5.47 years and a mass of 10.4 solar masses. Based on the mass of the object, its lack of a visible spectrum, and circumstellar matter in the system with many heavy elements (as would be produced by a past supernova in the system), it was thought to be probably a black hole.

A 2021 study could not confirm this object, but found signs that there may be a third object which is fainter than the other components, which would be a mid to late-type B-type star.

A 2025 study combining all previous eclipse data and astrometry from the Hipparcos and Gaia spacecraft again suggested the presence of an outer companion. The period, semi-major axis and mass were revised to 14.034 years, 17.88 au and 7.73 M_{☉}. Additional data could confirm the nature of this object as either a black hole or a B-type main-sequence star that was not directly detected yet. If the companion were a B-type star, it would explain the third light contribution found by the 2021 publication but not the apparent non-detection in the spectrum. If V Puppis were confirmed to harbour a black hole, it would be among the closest-known, with a similar distance to the current leader, Gaia BH1.

However, a 2026 study analysing more eclipse data found that the variations are well-explained by two orbiting stars, with the inner star matching the orbital period, semi-major axis and mass of the companion found by the 2025 study. The expected luminosity of these stars match the third-light contribution found in the 2021 publication, confirming that they are B-type stars.
