= Delta Pictoris =

Variable star in the constellation Pictor

- Location of δ Pictoris (circled)

Observation data Epoch J2000 Equinox J2000
- Constellation: Pictor
- Right ascension: 06^{h} 10^{m} 17.908^{s}
- Declination: −54° 58′ 07.11″
- Apparent magnitude (V): 4.72

Characteristics
- Evolutionary stage: Main sequence
- Spectral type: B1/2(III)n (B0.5:III?np + B0.5/3:)
- U−B color index: −1.00
- B−V color index: −0.229±0.008
- Variable type: β Lyr + β Cep

Astrometry
Radial velocity (R_{v})	+30.6±2.8 km/s
Proper motion (μ)	RA: −4.90 mas/yr Dec.: +7.41 mas/yr
Parallax (π)	2.51±0.15 mas
Distance	1,300 ± 80 ly (400 ± 20 pc)
Absolute magnitude (M_{V})	−3.27

Orbit
Period (P)	1.67254 d
Semi-major axis (a)	≥ 3.83 Gm (0.0256 AU)
Eccentricity (e)	0.050±0.17
Periastron epoch (T)	2,438,500.79±0.09 JD
Argument of periastron (ω) (secondary)	90±18°
Semi-amplitude (K_{1}) (primary)	167.0±2.8 km/s

Details

Primary
Mass	16.3 M_{☉}
Radius	7.62 R_{☉}
Luminosity	20,900 L_{☉}
Temperature	25,200 K
Rotational velocity (v sin i)	170 km/s

Secondary
Mass	8.6 M_{☉}
Radius	5.05 R_{☉}
Luminosity	4,790 L_{☉}
Temperature	21,400 K

Other designations
- δ Pic, del Pic, FK5 235, GC 7898, HD 42933, HIP 29276, HR 2212, SAO 234359

Database references
SIMBAD	data

Delta Pictoris, Latinized from δ Pictoris, is a binary star system in the southern constellation Pictor. It is visible to the naked with a combined apparent visual magnitude of 4.72. The system is located at a distance of approximately 1,300 light years from the Sun based on parallax measurements, and is drifting further away with a radial velocity of ~31 km/s. It is a runaway star system that is generating a bow shock as it moves through the interstellar medium.

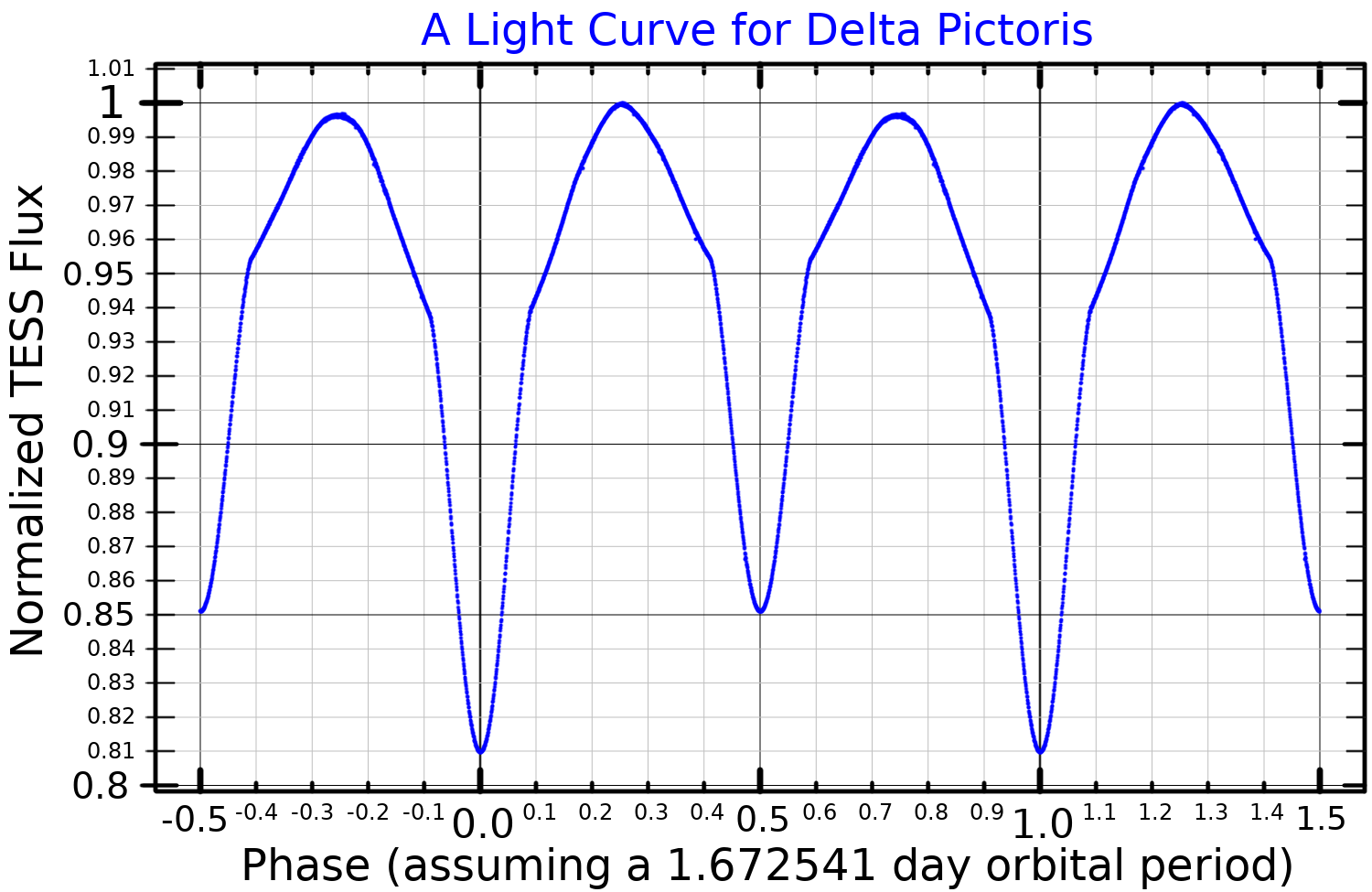
A light curve for Delta Pictoris, plotted from TESS data

The binary nature of this system was discovered by R. E. Wilson in 1914, then it was found to be variable by A. W. J. Cousins in 1951. A. D. A. Thackeray published orbital elements for the pair in 1966, showing they form an eclipsing double-lined spectroscopic binary with an orbital period of 1.67 days in essentially a circular orbit. The low inclination of the orbital plane results in shallow eclipses. The system is classified as a likely Beta Lyrae-type eclipsing binary with a peak magnitude of 4.65, which drops to 4.90 during the primary eclipse and 4.83 in the secondary eclipse. It is probably a detached binary system with no circumstellar material being found.

Both components of this system are massive main sequence stars with a combined stellar classification of B1/2(III)n. One member of the pair displays β Cep type pulsational behavior. Mass estimates give a primary with 16.3 times the mass of the Sun and a secondary with about half that.
