= DV Aquarii =

Binary star in the constellation Aquarius

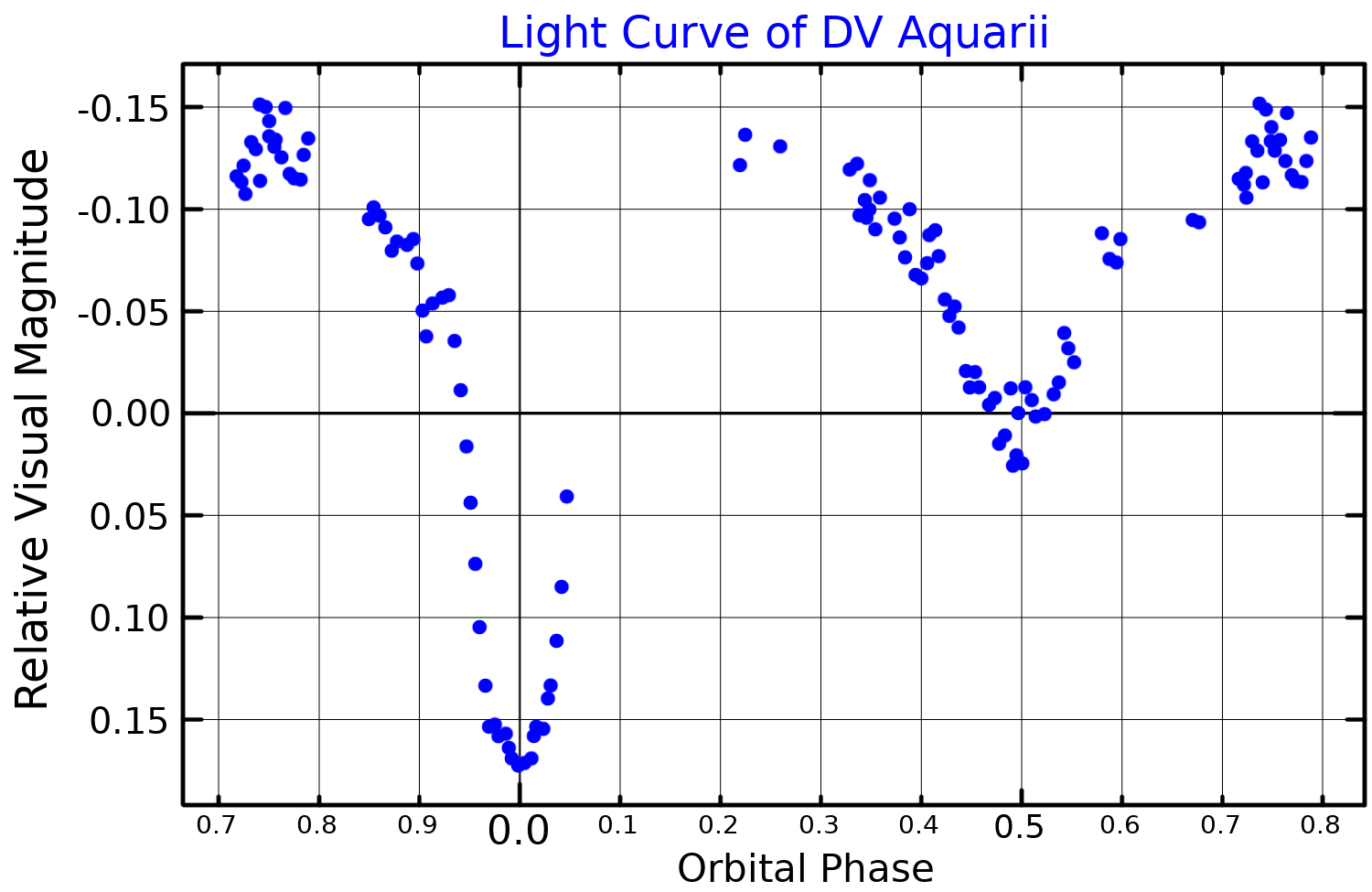
- The visual band light curve of DV Aquarii, adapted from Okazaki (1985)

Observation data Epoch J2000 Equinox ICRS
- Constellation: Aquarius
- Right ascension: 20^{h} 58^{m} 41.84009^{s}
- Declination: −14° 28′ 59.2527″
- Apparent magnitude (V): 5.89

Characteristics
- Evolutionary stage: main sequence
- Spectral type: A9 V
- B−V color index: 0.244±0.009
- Variable type: β Lyr

Astrometry
Radial velocity (R_{v})	+10.3±7.4 km/s
Proper motion (μ)	RA: −54.986 mas/yr Dec.: −18.428 mas/yr
Parallax (π)	11.2032±0.1015 mas
Distance	291 ± 3 ly (89.3 ± 0.8 pc)
Absolute magnitude (M_{V})	1.25

Orbit
Period (P)	1.5755 d
Eccentricity (e)	0 (adopted)
Inclination (i)	83.18±0.11°
Periastron epoch (T)	2426160.50 JD
Semi-amplitude (K_{1}) (primary)	95.5 km/s

Details

DV Aqr Aa
Mass	1.70 M_{☉}
Radius	2.756 R_{☉}
Luminosity	28.8+2.6 −2.4 L_{☉}
Surface gravity (log g)	3.97 cgs
Temperature	7,843±267 K
Rotational velocity (v sin i)	103 km/s
Age	679 Myr

DV Aqr Ab
Mass	1.01 M_{☉}
Radius	1.149 R_{☉}
Surface gravity (log g)	4.334 cgs
Temperature	6,056±240 K

Other designations
- BD−15°5848, HD 199603, HIP 103545, HR 8024, SAO 164027

Database references
SIMBAD	data

DV Aquarii is a binary star system in the zodiac constellation of Aquarius, near the border with Capricornus. It has a peak apparent visual magnitude of 5.89, which is bright enough to be visible to the naked eye. The distance can be estimated from its annual parallax shift of 11.2 mas, yielding a separation of 291 light years.

This is a detached eclipsing binary system of the Beta Lyrae type. The orbital period for the system is 1.5755 days and the eccentricity is unknown and probably non-zero; the orbital inclination is estimated to be 83.18°±0.11°. During the primary eclipse the magnitude drops to 6.25. It descends to 6.10 with the secondary eclipse (with 6.10 being brighter than 6.25). The pair have been identified as candidate Herbig Ae/Be stars, and catalogued as A-type shell stars.

A magnitude 10.8 star with the designation HD 358087 is a common proper motion companion. It is located at an angular separation of 129″ and has 78% of the Sun's mass. If it is gravitationally bound to the main system, the orbital period is estimated to be around 611,855 years

This star was a part of the obsolete constellation Norma Nilotica.
