= GT Muscae =

Variable star in the constellation Musca

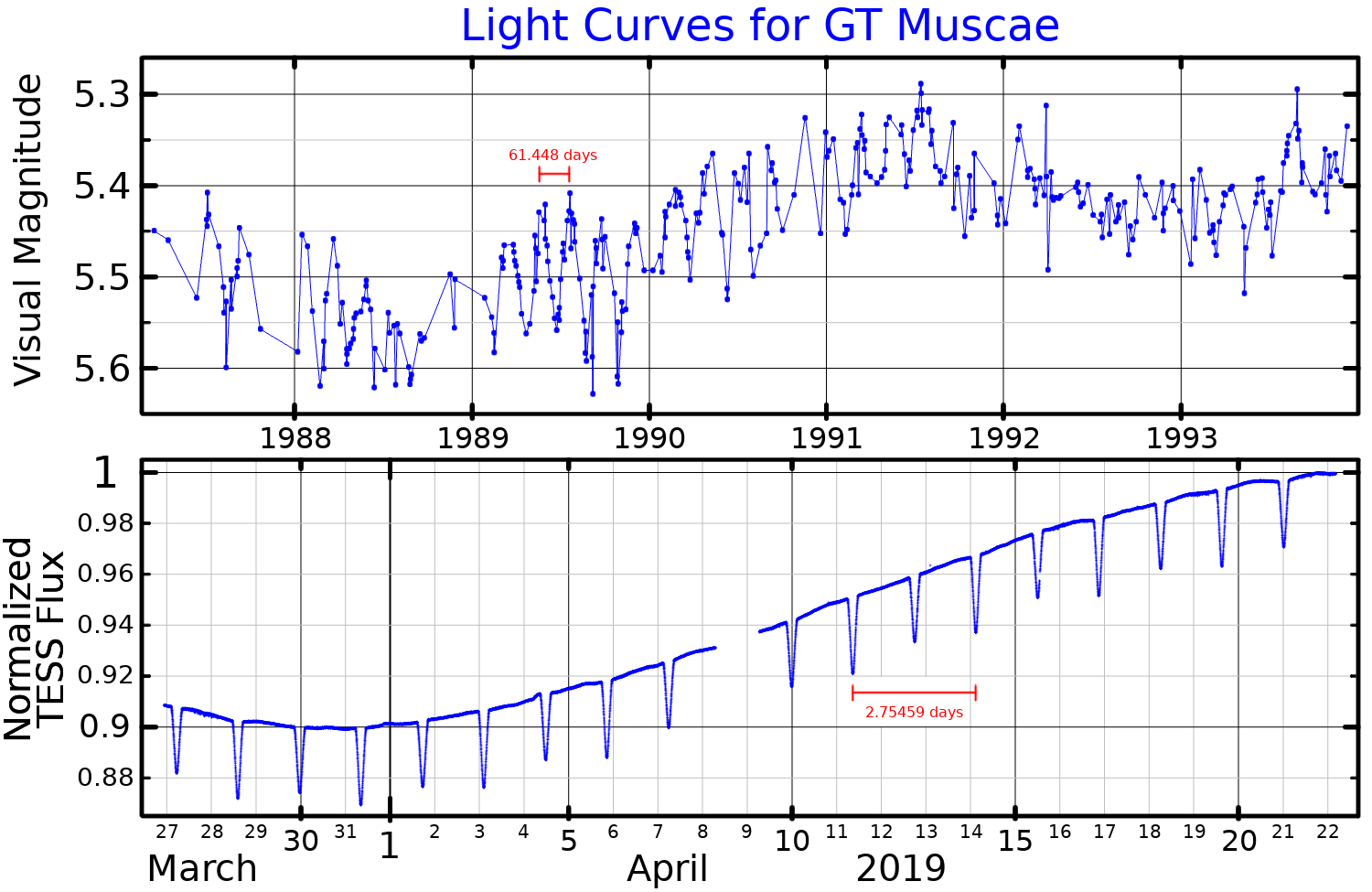
- Light curves for GT Muscae. The upper panel (adapted from Murdoch et al.) shows the long-term variability after a model of the eclipsing binary variability has been removed. The orbital period of HD 101379 is shown in red. The lower panel shows TESS data, in which the eclipses (both primary and secondary) are clearly visible. The orbital period of HD 101380 is shown in red.

Observation data Epoch J2000.0 Equinox ICRS
- Constellation: Musca
- Right ascension: 11^{h} 39^{m} 29.56610^{s}
- Declination: −65° 23′ 52.0995″
- Apparent magnitude (V): 4.96 - 5.23

Characteristics
- Spectral type: A: G5/8III+F, B: A0V+A2V
- Variable type: Algol + RS CVn

Astrometry
Proper motion (μ)	RA: −29.762±0.561 mas/yr Dec.: 5.783±0.504 mas/yr
Parallax (π)	8.3972±0.5075 mas
Distance	390 ± 20 ly (119 ± 7 pc)

Orbit
Primary	A (HD 101379)
Name	B (HD 101380)
Period (P)	96.8±2.4 yr
Semi-major axis (a)	0.276″±0.004″
Eccentricity (e)	0.634±0.015
Inclination (i)	60.9±2°
Longitude of the node (Ω)	259.8±1.5°
Periastron epoch (T)	2452778±110
Argument of periastron (ω) (secondary)	92.4±1.5°

Orbit
Primary	Aa
Name	Ab
Period (P)	61.448±0.007 d
Periastron epoch (T)	2444929±6
Argument of periastron (ω) (secondary)	238±24°
Semi-amplitude (K_{1}) (primary)	12.7±0.2 km/s

Orbit
Primary	Ba
Name	Bb
Period (P)	2.75459 d

Details

A
Mass	1.1±0.3 M_{☉}
Radius	16.6±1 R_{☉}
Luminosity	126 L_{☉}
Surface gravity (log g)	1.89±0.05 cgs
Temperature	4,744±125 K

Other designations
- 12 Muscae, HD 101379, HD 101380, HIP 56862, HR 4492, SAO 251522, WDS J11395-6524AB, B 1705 AB

Database references
SIMBAD	data

GT Muscae, also known as 12 Muscae, is a variable star about 400 light years from the Earth, in the constellation Musca. It is a 5th magnitude star, so it should be faintly visible to the naked eye of an observer far from city lights. It is a quadruple star system, consisting of a spectroscopic binary containing an RS Canum Venaticorum variable (RS CVn) star (HD 101379), orbiting an eclipsing binary (HD 101380). It varies in brightness from magnitude 4.96 to 5.23. GT Muscae is a very active X-ray source.

In 1929, Willem van den Bos discovered that GT Muscae is a visual double star, whose A (HD 101379) and B (HD 101380) components were separated by 0.2 arc seconds at the time he observed it. Examining photographic plates in 1964, Wolfgang Strohmeier et al. discovered that GT Muscae is a variable star. In 1979, based on spectroscopic features, Edward Weiler and Robert Stencel listed GT Muscae as a likely RS CVn variable. Eclipses of the HD 101380 pair were first reported by Andrew Collier Cameron in his 1982 PhD thesis, in which he also determined that pair's orbital period. The entire star system was given the variable star designation GT Muscae in 1988.

Strong, variable, 5 GHz radio emission from GT Muscae, indicative of flares, was detected in 1982 and was interpreted as indicating high levels of chromospheric and coronal activity.

GT Muscae was detected in the early observations of the Uhuru X-ray satellite, originally denoted as 2U 1134–161, later renamed 4U 1137–65. Michael Garcia et al. identified HD 101379 as the source seen by Uhuru, in 1980. During the 2010-2019 decade, GT Muscae showed the most X-ray flare activity of any star in the sky, producing flares with energies as high as ~10^{38} ergs.
