= HD 102839 =

Star in the constellation Musca

- Location of HD 102839 (circled)

Observation data Epoch J2000 Equinox J2000
- Constellation: Musca
- Right ascension: 11^{h} 49^{m} 56.61541^{s}
- Declination: −70° 13′ 32.8408″
- Apparent magnitude (V): 4.98

Characteristics
- Spectral type: G6Ib
- U−B color index: +1.22
- B−V color index: +1.40

Astrometry
Radial velocity (R_{v})	+15.90 km/s
Proper motion (μ)	RA: −8.113 mas/yr Dec.: −0.834 mas/yr
Parallax (π)	2.1101±0.1063 mas
Distance	1,550 ± 80 ly (470 ± 20 pc)
Absolute magnitude (M_{V})	−2.33

Details
Mass	2.3 M_{☉}
Radius	78 R_{☉}
Luminosity	1,593 L_{☉}
Surface gravity (log g)	0.63 cgs
Temperature	4,500 K
Metallicity [Fe/H]	−0.34 dex
Rotational velocity (v sin i)	7.6 km/s

Other designations
- CPD−69°1595, FK5 2945, GC 16206, HD 102839, HIP 57696, HR 4538, SAO 251604, GSC 09230-02344

Database references
SIMBAD	data

HD 102839 is a yellow hued supergiant star in the southern constellation of Musca. With an apparent visual magnitude of 4.98, it is faintly visible to the naked eye under good viewing conditions. Based on a parallax of 2.11 mas, it is located at a distance of approximately 1,550 light-years (480 pc) away from Earth. The star is drifting further away with a line of sight velocity component of +16 km/s.

This star has a stellar classification of G6Ib, matching an evolved G-type supergiant star. With 2.3 times the mass of the Sun, it has expanded to 78 times the Sun's radius. It is spinning with a projected rotational velocity of 7.6 km/s. HD 102839 is radiating almost 1,600 times the luminosity of the Sun from its enlarged photosphere at an effective temperature of 4,500 K.
