= HD 40372 =

Variable star in the constellation Orion

- Location of HD 40372 (circled)

Observation data Epoch J2000.0 Equinox ICRS
- Constellation: Orion
- Right ascension: 05^{h} 58^{m} 24.44302^{s}
- Declination: +01° 50′ 13.5902″
- Apparent magnitude (V): 5.88 - 5.92

Characteristics
- Spectral type: A5me (kA7VmA7/F5III/Vp)
- Variable type: Beta Lyrae / Delta Scuti

Astrometry
Proper motion (μ)	RA: 7.208±0.033 mas/yr Dec.: −7.999±0.032 mas/yr
Parallax (π)	9.3752±0.0360 mas
Distance	348 ± 1 ly (106.7 ± 0.4 pc)

Orbit
Period (P)	2.7405 d
Eccentricity (e)	0.02
Argument of periastron (ω) (primary)	183.0°
Semi-amplitude (K_{1}) (primary)	55.6 km/s

Details

pulsating star
Mass	2.15 M_{☉}
Radius	2.78 R_{☉}
Luminosity	25 L_{☉}
Surface gravity (log g)	3.71 cgs
Temperature	7,706 K

companion
Mass	0.73 M_{☉}

Other designations
- 59 Orionis, BD+01 1171, V1004 Ori, HIP 28271, HR 2100, SAO 113315

Database references
SIMBAD	data

HD 40372, also known as 59 Orionis, V1004 Orionis and HR 2100, is a variable star in the constellation Orion. Its apparent magnitude varies between magnitude 5.88 and 5.92, making it faintly visible to the naked eye for an observer far from light polluted urban areas. HD 40372 exhibits two types of variability; it is an eclipsing binary star and one of the two stars is a Delta Scuti variable star.

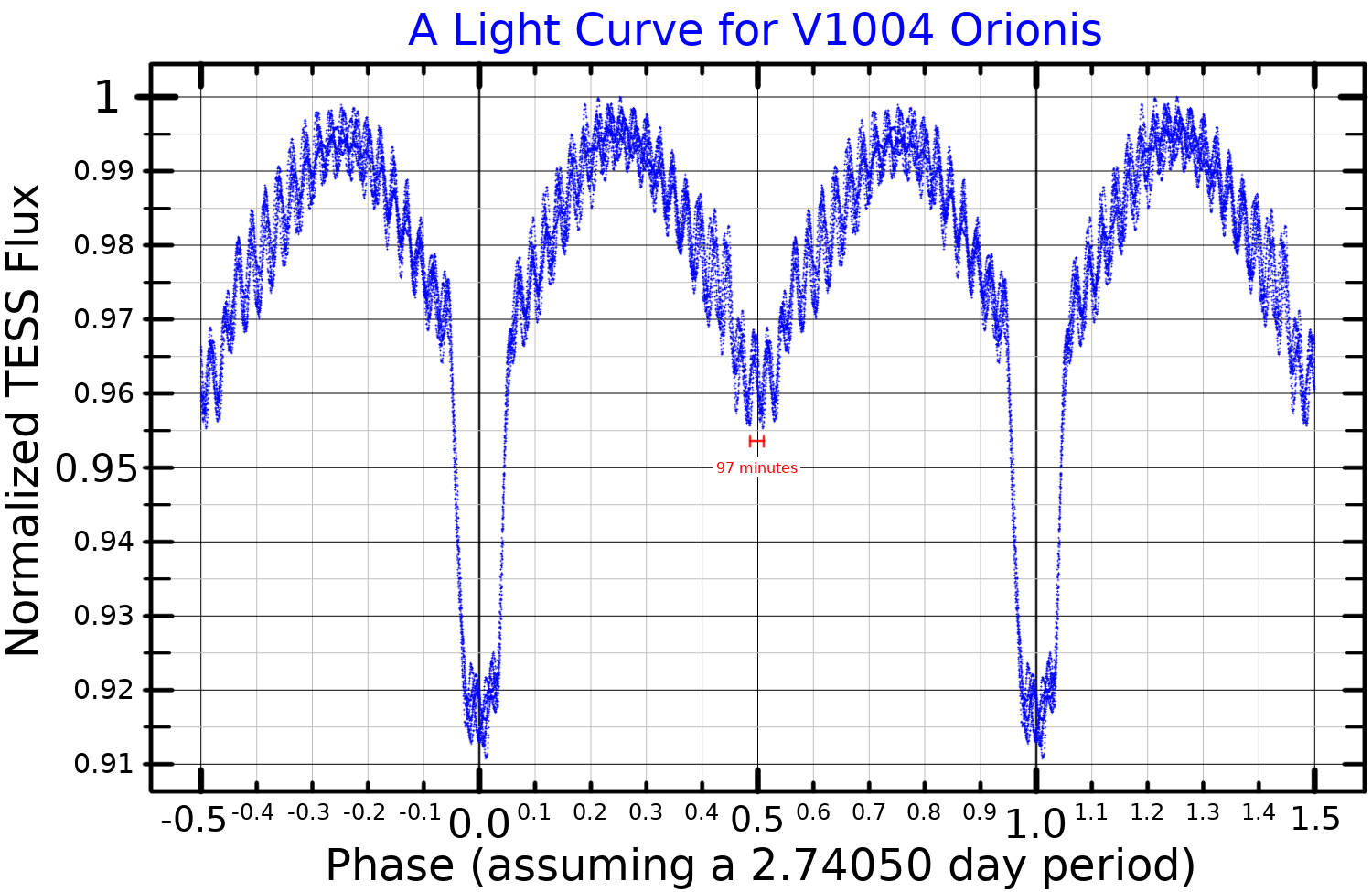
Light curve for HD 40372, plotted from TESS data. The data are folded with the eclipse period, and the 97 minute Delta Scuti variation period is marked in red.

HD 40372 was discovered to be a spectroscopic binary by the examination of spectra taken at the DDO in 1943 and 1944. Further DDO spectra taken in 1946 and 1947 allowed the binary's orbit to be calculated, and the period derived from those data, 2.74050 days, is still used in 21st century publications. In 1968, HD 40372 was found to have a "δ Del"-type spectrum. Because such a spectrum can indicate variability, the star was monitored with a photoelectric photometer, and found to be a Delta Scuti variable in 1973. It was given the variable star designation V1004 Orionis in 1974. Remarkably, the fact that HD 40372 is an eclipsing binary appears to have gone unnoticed until the Hipparcos data were processed by an automated light curve classifier in 2011, despite the fact that the brightness changes due to eclipses are far larger than the variations caused by the Delta Scuti pulsations.

The spectral type of the system is given as A5me, indicating an Am star. Such stars have unusual absorption line strengths for metals in comparison to hydrogen, and a detailed spectral classification of kA7VmA7/F5III/Vp indicates that the classification based on Calcium K-lines would be A7V, while the classification based on lines of other metals in the green part of the spectrum would be A7V and for metal lines in the violet F5III/IV. Because of the unusual luminosity effects in the spectrum, it has been considered to be a Delta Delphini star.

In 1985, HD 40372 was identified as a possible member of the Hyades Moving Group. Two visible companions are listed, a 10th-magnitude star at 37″ and a 7th-magnitude A0 main-sequence star at 178″. The closer of the two is an unrelated background object, but the more distant shares a common proper motion and is at the same distance. Any orbit, assuming they were gravitationally bound, would require about a million years.
