= TU Muscae =

Star in the constellation Musca

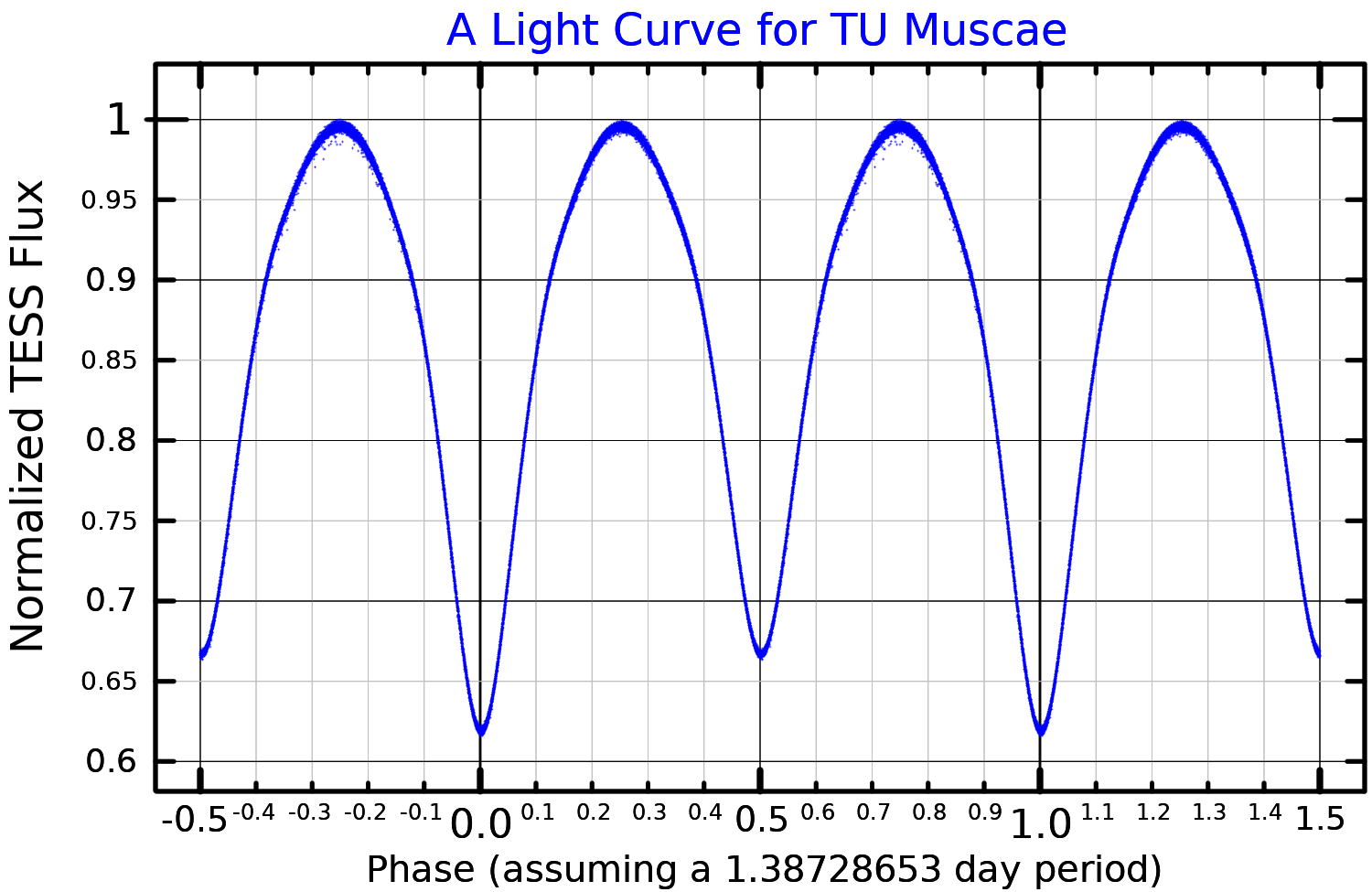
- A light curve for TU Muscae, plotted from TESS data

Observation data Epoch J2000.0 Equinox ICRS
- Constellation: Musca
- Right ascension: 11^{h} 31^{m} 10.92470^{s}
- Declination: −65° 44′ 32.1019″
- Apparent magnitude (V): 8.307(8.17 - 8.75)

Characteristics
- Spectral type: O7V + O8V
- U−B color index: −0.860
- B−V color index: +0.047
- Variable type: β Lyr

Astrometry
Radial velocity (R_{v})	−4 km/s
Proper motion (μ)	RA: −6.62 mas/yr Dec.: −1.21 mas/yr
Parallax (π)	0.02±0.76 mas

Orbit
Period (P)	1.387 days
Semi-major axis (a)	17.34 R_{☉}
Eccentricity (e)	0
Inclination (i)	77.7°
Longitude of the node (Ω)	3.137°
Semi-amplitude (K_{1}) (primary)	214.5 km/s
Semi-amplitude (K_{2}) (secondary)	345.8 km/s

Details

Primary
Mass	16.8 M_{☉}
Radius	7.2 R_{☉}
Luminosity	105,000 L_{☉}
Surface gravity (log g)	4.05 cgs
Temperature	35,000 K

secondary
Mass	10.5 M_{☉}
Radius	5.7 R_{☉}
Luminosity	35,000 L_{☉}
Surface gravity (log g)	4.04 cgs
Temperature	31,366 K

Other designations
- TU Muscae, HIP 56196, HD 100213, BD−65°1101, 2MASS J11311091-6544322

Database references
SIMBAD	data

TU Muscae, also known as HD 100213, is an eclipsing binary star in the constellation Musca. Its apparent magnitude ranges from 8.17 to 8.75 over around 1.4 days.

== Physical description ==
TU Muscae is a remote binary star system made up of two hot luminous blue main sequence stars of spectral types O7.5V and O9.5V, with masses 23 and 15 times that of the Sun. The stars are so close that they are in contact with each other (overcontact binary) and are classed as a Beta Lyrae variable as their light varies from earth as they eclipse each other. The spectra indicate they are hot stars, with surface temperatures of roughly 37200 and 34700 K respectively. They are both still on the main sequence of star evolution, burning their core hydrogen. Astronomers Laura Penny and Cynthia Ouszt proposed the two were originally more equal in size but as they became close enough so that material from the less massive star began transferring to the more massive star via Roche-lobe overflow. However they concede that figuring out the evolution of interacting massive binary systems is "a little like trying to unspill milk". The system is thought to be around 4.8 kiloparsecs (~15500 light-years) distant.

The period of the magnitude change is increasing, and has been calculated as lengthening by 3.46 seconds a century. This could be due to material from the less massive star being transferred to the more massive one, or there could be a third or fourth as yet undetected star in the multiple star system influencing the orbit. These stars have not been seen as they are much less luminous than the two main stars.

== Discovery ==
TU Muscae was discovered by Dutch astronomer Pieter Oosterhoff in 1928. Initially thought to have a spectrum of B3, later observations in the 1960s and early 1970s indicated it was a hotter star than previously thought—with the spectrum lying in the uncommon O-region.
