= Lambda Chamaeleontis =

Star in the constellation Musca

λ Chamaeleontis
- Location of λ Chamaeleontis (circled)

Observation data Epoch J2000 Equinox J2000
- Constellation: Musca
- Right ascension: 12^{h} 07^{m} 49.87572^{s}
- Declination: −75° 22′ 01.2650″
- Apparent magnitude (V): 5.165

Characteristics
- Evolutionary stage: red giant branch
- Spectral type: K2II/III
- U−B color index: +1.37
- B−V color index: +1.30

Astrometry
Radial velocity (R_{v})	−45.30±0.8 km/s
Proper motion (μ)	RA: −92.609 mas/yr Dec.: +19.332 mas/yr
Parallax (π)	6.6166±0.0819 mas
Distance	493 ± 6 ly (151 ± 2 pc)
Absolute magnitude (M_{V})	−0.40

Details
Mass	1.6 M_{☉}
Radius	28 R_{☉}
Luminosity	295 L_{☉}
Surface gravity (log g)	1.92 cgs
Temperature	4,544 K
Metallicity [Fe/H]	−0.26 dex

Other designations
- λ Cha, CPD−74°880, FK5 2971, HD 105340, HIP 59151, HR 4617, SAO 256905

Database references
SIMBAD	data

Lambda Chamaeleontis, Latinized from λ Chamaeleontis, is a star located in the constellation Musca. Lambda Chamaeleontis is also known as HR 4617, and HD 105340. This star is visible to the naked eye as a dim, orange-hued star with an apparent visual magnitude of 5.165. It is located 493 light-years (151 parsecs) from the Sun, based on its parallax, but is drifting closer with a radial velocity of −45 km/s.

This is an aging K-type giant/bright giant with a stellar classification of K2II/III. With the supply of hydrogen at its core exhausted, the star expanded and cooled. It now has 28 times the radius of the Sun and is radiating 295 times the Sun's luminosity from its enlarged photosphere at an effective temperature of 4,544 K.

The star was first designated Lambda Chamaeleontis by French astronomer Lacaille, in his Coelum Australe Stelliferum. He listed it close to Pi Chamaeleontis in both brightness and location. The IAU redefinition of the constellation borders in 1930, has placed Lambda Chamaeleontis slightly over the border in Musca, rather than Chamaeleon.
