= HD 115211 =

Star in the constellation Musca

- Location of HD 115211 (circled in red)

Observation data Epoch J2000 Equinox ICRS
- Constellation: Musca
- Right ascension: 13^{h} 17^{m} 13.01064^{s}
- Declination: −66° 47′ 00.3789″
- Apparent magnitude (V): 4.86

Characteristics
- Spectral type: K2 Ib-II
- B−V color index: 1.480±0.004
- Variable type: Suspected

Astrometry
Radial velocity (R_{v})	−10.38±0.17 km/s
Proper motion (μ)	RA: −15.03±0.20 mas/yr Dec.: −6.63±0.17 mas/yr
Parallax (π)	2.3868±0.1235 mas
Distance	1,370 ± 70 ly (420 ± 20 pc)
Absolute magnitude (M_{V})	−2.94

Details
Mass	7.1±0.8 M_{☉}
Radius	123.18+2.84 −8.96 R_{☉}
Luminosity	3,849±234 L_{☉}
Temperature	4,097+158 −47 K
Rotational velocity (v sin i)	2.5±1.2 km/s
Age	39.8±4.9 Myr

Other designations
- NSV 6164, CD−66°1385, GC 17959, HD 115211, HIP 64820, HR 5002, SAO 252240

Database references
SIMBAD	data

HD 115211 is a single star in the southern constellation of Musca. It has an orange hue and is faintly visible to the naked eye with an apparent visual magnitude of 4.86. Its distance from Earth is approximately 1,370 light years based on parallax, and it is drifting closer to the Sun with a radial velocity of −10 km/s. It has an absolute magnitude of −2.94.

It is an aging bright giant/supergiant star with a stellar classification of K2 Ib-II. It is a suspected variable star of unknown type, with a brightness that has been measured ranging from 4.83 down to 4.87. It is an estimated 40 million years old, with 7.1 times the mass of the Sun. With the supply of hydrogen exhausted at its core, it has expanded to 123 times the Sun's radius. It is radiating 3,849 times the luminosity of the Sun from its swollen photosphere at an effective temperature of 4,097 K.
