= PSR J1141−6545 =

Pulsar in the constellation of Musca

Observation data Epoch J2000 Equinox ICRS
- Constellation: Musca
- Right ascension: 11^{h} 41^{m} 07.0220^{s}
- Declination: −65° 45′ 19.089″

Orbit
Primary	A (pulsar)
Name	B (white dwarf)
Period (P)	0.1976509593 d
Eccentricity (e)	0.171884
Inclination (i)	>75°
Periastron epoch (T)	MJD 51369.854553(1)
Argument of periastron (ω) (secondary)	42.4561°

Details

A (pulsar)
Mass	1.30 ± 0.02 M_{☉}
Rotation	0.3938988148378 s
Age	1.45 Myr

B (white dwarf)
Mass	0.986 ± 0.020 M_{☉}
Age	1.45 Myr

Database references
SIMBAD	data

PSR J1141−6545 is a pulsar in the constellation of Musca (the fly). Located at 11h 41m 07.02s −65° 45′ 19.1″, it is a binary pair composed of a white dwarf star orbiting a pulsar. Because of this unusual configuration and the close proximity of the two stars it has been used to test several of Einstein's theories.

PSR J1141−6545 is notable because it has shown several relativistic theories to have real-world results. The star is emitting gravitational waves and the process of time dilation appears to be affecting the orbit of the white dwarf. In January 2020 it was announced that the stars were also showing the Lense-Thirring effect, whereby a rotating mass drags the surrounding spacetime with it.

== See also ==
- Hulse–Taylor pulsar
- PSR J0737−3039
