= Iota2 Muscae =

B-type main sequence star in the constellation Musca

Observation data Epoch J2000.0 Equinox J2000.0 (ICRS)
- Constellation: Musca
- Right ascension: 13^{h} 27^{m} 18.49716^{s}
- Declination: −74° 41′ 30.3203″
- Apparent magnitude (V): 6.62

Characteristics
- Evolutionary stage: main sequence
- Spectral type: B9V
- B−V color index: −0.056±0.004

Astrometry
Radial velocity (R_{v})	−3.0±7.4 km/s
Proper motion (μ)	RA: −35.337 mas/yr Dec.: −13.814 mas/yr
Parallax (π)	6.6274±0.0366 mas
Distance	492 ± 3 ly (150.9 ± 0.8 pc)
Absolute magnitude (M_{V})	0.61

Details
Mass	2.8 M_{☉}
Radius	2.5 R_{☉}
Luminosity	71 L_{☉}
Surface gravity (log g)	4.09 cgs
Temperature	10,641 K
Metallicity [Fe/H]	−0.19 dex
Rotational velocity (v sin i)	116 km/s

Other designations
- ι^{2} Mus, CD−74°793, HD 116579, HIP 65628, HR 5051, SAO 257047

Database references
SIMBAD	data

ι^{2} Muscae, Latinised as Iota^{2} Muscae, is a blue-white-hued star in the southern constellation Musca, near the constellation's southern border with Chamaeleon. It has an apparent visual magnitude of 6.62, which is just below the normal limit of stellar brightness visible to the naked eye. Based upon parallax measurements, it is located around 492 light-years (151 parsecs) from the Sun. It is a member of the Hyades Stream, but is not part of the Hyades or Praesepe open clusters.

This is a B-type main-sequence star with a stellar classification of B9V. It has a high rate of spin, showing a projected rotational velocity of 116 km/s. The star has 2.8 times the mass of the Sun and is radiating 71 times the Sun's luminosity from its photosphere at an effective temperature of about 10,641 K.
