= Iota1 Muscae =

Star in the constellation Musca

ι^{1} Muscae
Observation data Epoch J2000.0 Equinox J2000.0 (ICRS)
- Constellation: Musca
- Right ascension: 13^{h} 25^{m} 07.11942^{s}
- Declination: −74° 53′ 16.1512″
- Apparent magnitude (V): 5.05

Characteristics
- Evolutionary stage: red clump
- Spectral type: K0 III
- U−B color index: +1.01
- B−V color index: +1.11

Astrometry
| Radial velocity (R_{v}) | 27.5±0.8 km/s |
| Proper motion (μ) | RA: −107.80 mas/yr Dec.: −132.25 mas/yr |
| Parallax (π) | 14.7839±0.1205 mas |
| Distance | 221 ± 2 ly (67.6 ± 0.6 pc) |
| Absolute magnitude (M_{V}) | +0.88 |

Details
| Mass | 1.5 M_{☉} |
| Radius | 11.78+0.22 −0.47 R_{☉} |
| Luminosity | 56.5±0.6 L_{☉} |
| Surface gravity (log g) | 2.64 cgs |
| Temperature | 4,610+96 −42 K |
| Metallicity [Fe/H] | −0.10 dex |
| Rotational velocity (v sin i) | 4.27 km/s |

Other designations
- ι^{1} Mus, CPD−74°1057, FK5 3070, HD 116244, HIP 65468, HR 5042, SAO 257041

Database references
| SIMBAD | data |

ι^{1} Muscae, Latinised as Iota^{1} Muscae, is a solitary star in the southern constellation of Musca, near the southern constellation border with Chamaeleon. It is visible to the naked eye as a dim, orange-hued star with an apparent visual magnitude is 5.05. The star is located around 222 light-years distant from the Sun based on parallax, and is drifting further away with a radial velocity of 27.5 km/s.

This object is an aging giant star with a stellar classification of K0III; a star that has used up its core hydrogen and is cooling and expanding. At present it has nearly 12 times the girth of the Sun. The star is radiating 56.5 times the luminosity of the Sun from its swollen photosphere at an effective temperature of about 4,610 K.
