= Beta Lyrae variable =

Type of variable stellar binary

Beta Lyrae type eclipsing binary star. Heavier, whiter component is surrounded with a gas ring. Gas comes to teardrop shaped secondary component.

Beta Lyrae variables are a class of close binary stars. Their total brightness is variable because the two component stars orbit each other, and in this orbit one component periodically passes in front of the other one, thereby blocking its light. The two component stars of Beta Lyrae systems are quite heavy (several solar masses (M_{☉}) each) and extended (giants or supergiants). They are so close, that their shapes are heavily distorted by mutual gravitation forces: the stars have ellipsoidal shapes, and there are extensive mass flows from one component to the other.

== Mass flows ==
These mass flows occur because one of the stars, in the course of its evolution, has become a giant or supergiant. Such extended stars easily lose mass, just because they are so large: gravitation at their surface is weak, so gas easily escapes (the so-called stellar wind). In close binary systems such as beta Lyrae systems, a second effect reinforces this mass loss: when a giant star swells, it may fill its Roche lobe, that is, a mathematical surface surrounding the two components of a binary star where matter may freely flow from one component to the other.

In binary stars the heaviest star generally is the first to evolve into a giant or supergiant. Calculations show that its mass loss then will become so large that in a comparatively very short time (less than half a million years) this star, that was once the heaviest, now becomes the lighter of the two components. Part of its mass is transferred to the companion star, the rest is lost in space.

== Light curves ==
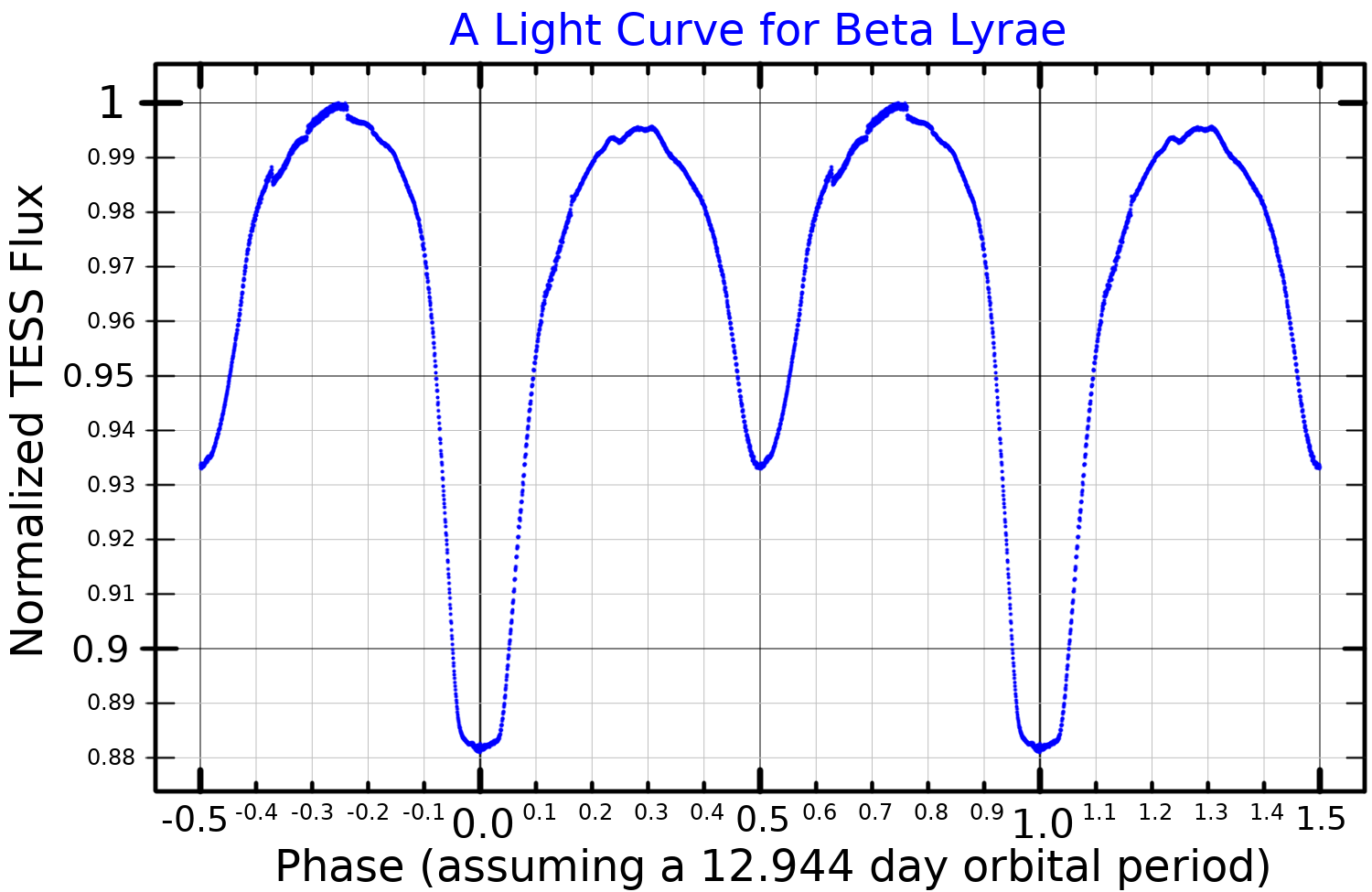
A light curve for Beta Lyrae, plotted from TESS data

The light curves of beta Lyrae variables are quite smooth: eclipses start and end so gradually that the exact moments are impossible to define. This occurs because the flow of mass between the components is so large that it envelopes the whole system in a common atmosphere. The amplitude of the brightness variations is in most cases less than one magnitude; the largest amplitude known is 2.3 magnitudes (V480 Lyrae).

The period of the brightness variations is very regular. It is determined by the revolution period of the binary - the time it takes for the two components to orbit once around each other. These periods are short, typically one or a few days. The shortest-known period is 0.29 days (QY Hydrae); the longest is 198.5 days (W Crucis). In beta Lyrae systems with periods longer than 100 days one of the components is generally a supergiant.

Beta Lyrae systems are sometimes regarded as a subtype of the Algol variables; however, their light curves differ (the eclipses of Algol variables are much more sharply defined). On the other hand, beta Lyrae variables look somewhat like W Ursae Majoris variables; however, the latter are in general yet closer binaries (so-called contact binaries), and their component stars are mostly lighter than the beta Lyrae system components (about 1 M_{☉}).

== Examples of β Lyrae stars ==
The prototype of the β Lyrae type variable stars is β Lyrae, also called Sheliak. Its variability was discovered in 1784 by John Goodricke.

Nearly a thousand β Lyrae binaries are known: the latest edition of the General Catalogue of Variable Stars (2003) lists 835 of them (2.2% of all variable stars). Data for the ten brightest β Lyrae variables are given below. (See also the list of known variable stars.)

star	type (Note: EB = Beta Lyrae variable; D = detached binary; DSCTC = Delta Scuti variable; GS = at least one giant or supergiant component; KE = contact binary; RS = RS Canum Venaticorum variable; SD = semi-detached binary)	period (days)	maximum magnitude	minimum magnitude	spectrum	distance (lightyears)
ζ And (Shimu)	EB/GS/RS	17.7695	3.92	4.14	K1II-III	181
DV Aqr	EB	1.575529	5.89	6,25	A9V	280
UW CMa	~EB/KE	4.393407	4.84	5.33	O7Ia:fp+OB	~3000
τ CMa	EB	1.28	4.32	4.37	O9Ib	~3000
β Lyr (Sheliak) (prototype)	EB	12.913834	3.25	4.36	B8II-IIIep	880
TU Mus	EB/KE	1.3	8.17	8.75	O7.5V + O9.5V	15500
δ Pic	~EB/D	1.672541	4.65	4.90	B3III+O9V	1700
V Pup	EB/SD	1.4544859	4.35	4.92	B1Vp+B3:	1200
PU Pup	EB	2.57895	4.69	4.75	B9	550
υ Sgr	EB/GS	137.939	4.53	4.61	B8pI:+O9V ? (or F2p?)	~1700
μ^{1} Sco (Xamidimura)	EB/SD	1.44626907	2.94	3.22	B1.5V+B6.5V	800
π Sco (Fang)	EB	1.57	2.82	2.85	B1V+B2V	460
HD 40372	EB/DSCTC	2.74050	5.88	5.92	A5m	350
CX CMa	EB		9.9	10.7	B5V	
